= List of awards and nominations received by The Crying Game =

The Crying Game awards and nominations
Award	Wins	Honours	Nominations
Totals
Academy Awards	1	0	6
British Academy Film Awards	1	0	7
Golden Globe Awards	0	0	1
Argentine Film Critics Association	0	0	1
Awards Circuit Community Awards	0	0	5
Boston Society of Film Critics	1	0	1
Chicago Film Critics Association	1	0	7
Dallas–Fort Worth Film Critics Association	0	0	1
London Film Critics' Circle	3	0	3
Los Angeles Film Critics Association	1	2	3
National Board of Review	1	1	2
National Society of Film Critics	1	5	6
New York Film Critics Circle	2	0	2
Southeastern Film Critics Association	0	1	1
Directors Guild of America	0	0	1
Producers Guild of America	1	0	1
Writers Guild of America	1	0	1
Writers' Guild of Great Britain	1	0	1
20/20 Awards	1	0	5
Amanda Award	1	0	1
ASCAP Film and Television Music Awards	1	0	1
Australian Film Institute	1	0	1
David di Donatello Awards	0	0	2
Edgar Allan Poe Awards	0	0	1
European Film Awards	1	0	1
Film Independent Spirit Awards	1	0	1
Goya Awards	0	0	1
Italian National Syndicate of Film Journalists	0	0	1
MTV Video Music Awards	0	0	1
NAACP Image Awards	0	0	1
Satellite Awards	0	0	1
Wins	21
Honours	9
Nominations	68
- Footnotes

The Crying Game is a 1992 British–Irish drama film, directed by Neil Jordan. Released to critical acclaim, the film has garnered multiple award nominations, those of which consist of major award associations – the 65th Academy Awards, where Jordan was the recipient for Best Original Screenplay and the 46th British Academy Film Awards (BAFTA), while the film's producer, Stephen Woolley, acquired the award for Best British Film, as well as a nomination at the 50th Golden Globe Awards for Best Motion Picture – Drama.

== Awards and nominations ==
Association	Date of ceremony	Category	Nominee	Result	Ref.
Academy Awards	29 March 1993	Best Actor	Stephen Rea	Nominated	
Academy Awards	29 March 1993	Best Supporting Actor	Jaye Davidson	Nominated	
Academy Awards	29 March 1993	Best Director	Neil Jordan	Nominated	
Academy Awards	29 March 1993	Best Editing	Kant Pan	Nominated	
Academy Awards	29 March 1993	Best Picture	Stephen Woolley	Nominated	
Academy Awards	29 March 1993	Best Original Screenplay	Neil Jordan	Won	
British Academy Film Awards	21 March 1993	Best Actor in a Leading Role	Stephen Rea	Nominated	
British Academy Film Awards	21 March 1993	Best Actor in a Supporting Role	Jaye Davidson	Nominated	
British Academy Film Awards	21 March 1993	Best Actress in a Supporting Role	Miranda Richardson (Note: Miranda Richardson, having been nominated for two films in this category, received the award for her role in Damage.)	Nominated	
British Academy Film Awards	21 March 1993	Best British Film (Note: The Alexander Korda Award was presented for this specific category.)	Stephen Woolley	Won	
British Academy Film Awards	21 March 1993	Achievement in Direction (Note: The David Lean Award was presented for this specific category.)	Neil Jordan	Nominated	
British Academy Film Awards	21 March 1993	Best Film	Stephen Woolley, Neil Jordan	Nominated	
British Academy Film Awards	21 March 1993	Best Original Screenplay	Neil Jordan	Nominated	
Golden Globe Awards	23 January 1993	Best Motion Picture – Drama	The Crying Game	Nominated	
Argentine Film Critics Association	1994	Best Foreign Film (Note: The Silver Condor Award was presented for this ceremony.)	Neil Jordan	Nominated	
Awards Circuit Community Awards	1992	Best Director	Neil Jordan	Nominated	
Awards Circuit Community Awards	1992	Best Actor in a Supporting Role	Jaye Davidson	Nominated	
Awards Circuit Community Awards	1992	Best Actress in a Supporting Role	Miranda Richardson	Nominated	
Awards Circuit Community Awards	1992	Best Original Screenplay	Neil Jordan	Nominated	
Awards Circuit Community Awards	1992	Best Film Editing	Kant Pan	Nominated	
Boston Society of Film Critics	December 1992	Best Screenplay	Neil Jordan	Won	
Chicago Film Critics Association	1993	Best Foreign Language Film	The Crying Game	Won	
Chicago Film Critics Association	1993	Best Supporting Actress	Miranda Richardson	Nominated	
Chicago Film Critics Association	1993	Best Film	Stephen Woolley	Nominated	
Chicago Film Critics Association	1993	Best Director	Neil Jordan	Nominated	
Chicago Film Critics Association	1993	Best Original Screenplay	Neil Jordan	Nominated	
Chicago Film Critics Association	1993	Most Promising Actor	Jaye Davidson	Nominated	
Chicago Film Critics Association	1993	Most Promising Actress	Jaye Davidson	Nominated	
Dallas–Fort Worth Film Critics Association	1993	Best Film	The Crying Game	Nominated	
London Film Critics' Circle	1993	British Director of the Year	Neil Jordan	Won	
London Film Critics' Circle	1993	British Screenwriter of the Year	Neil Jordan	Won	
London Film Critics' Circle	1993	British Producer of the Year	Stephen Woolley	Won	
Los Angeles Film Critics Association	12 December 1992	Best Supporting Actress	Miranda Richardson	Runner-up	
Los Angeles Film Critics Association	12 December 1992	Best Screenplay	Neil Jordan	Runner-up	
Los Angeles Film Critics Association	12 December 1992	Best Foreign Film	Neil Jordan	Won	
National Board of Review	1992	Most Auspicious Debut	Jaye Davidson	Won	
National Board of Review	1992	Top Ten Films	The Crying Game	Runner-up	
National Society of Film Critics	3 January 1993	Best Film	The Crying Game	Runner-up	
National Society of Film Critics	3 January 1993	Best Actor	Stephen Rea	Won	
National Society of Film Critics	3 January 1993	Best Actor	Jaye Davidson	Runner-up	
National Society of Film Critics	3 January 1993	Best Supporting Actress	Miranda Richardson	Runner-up	
National Society of Film Critics	3 January 1993	Best Director	Neil Jordan	3rd place	
National Society of Film Critics	3 January 1993	Best Screenplay	Neil Jordan	Runner-up	
New York Film Critics Circle	17 January 1993	Best Supporting Actress	Miranda Richardson (Note: Miranda Richardson is the recipient of this award for her performances in The Crying Game, Damage and Enchanted April.)	Won	
New York Film Critics Circle	17 January 1993	Best Screenplay	Neil Jordan	Won	
Southeastern Film Critics Association	1993	Top 10 Films	The Crying Game	4th place	
Directors Guild of America	6 March 1993	Outstanding Directing – Feature Film	Neil Jordan	Nominated	
Producers Guild Award	3 March 1993	Best Theatrical Motion Picture	Stephen Woolley	Won	
Writers Guild of America	1993	Best Original Screenplay	Neil Jordan	Won	
Writers' Guild of Great Britain	1993	Film – Screenplay	Neil Jordan	Won	
20/20 Awards	2013	Best Picture	The Crying Game	Nominated	
20/20 Awards	2013	Best Director	Neil Jordan	Won	
20/20 Awards	2013	Best Actor	Stephen Rea	Nominated	
20/20 Awards	2013	Best Supporting Actor	Jaye Davidson	Nominated	
20/20 Awards	2013	Best Original Screenplay	Neil Jordan	Nominated	
Amanda Award	1993	Best Film (International)	Neil Jordan	Won	
ASCAP Film and Television Music Awards	1994	Top Box Office Films	Anne Dudley	Won	
Australian Film Institute	5 November 1993	Best Foreign Film	Stephen Woolley	Won	
David di Donatello Awards	1993	Best Foreign Actor	Stephen Rea	Nominated	
David di Donatello Awards	1993	Best Foreign Film	Neil Jordan	Nominated	
Edgar Allan Poe Awards	1993	Best Motion Picture	Neil Jordan	Nominated	
European Film Awards	1993	European Achievement of the Year	Nik Powell, Stephen Woolley	Won	
Film Independent Spirit Awards	27 March 1993	Best International Film	Neil Jordan	Won	
Goya Awards	21 January 1994	Best European Film	Neil Jordan	Nominated	
Italian National Syndicate of Film Journalists	1994	Best Foreign Film (Note: The Silver Ribbon (Nastro d'Argento) was presented for this ceremony.)	Neil Jordan	Nominated	
MTV Video Music Awards	2 September 1993	Best Video for a Film	Boy George ("The Crying Game")	Nominated	
NAACP Image Awards	1995	Outstanding Supporting Actor in a Motion Picture	Forest Whitaker	Nominated	
Satellite Awards	17 December 2005	Outstanding Overall DVD	The Crying Game (Collector's Edition)	Nominated	

== Most nominated ==
Nominee	Nominations	Wins	Honours
Neil Jordan	29	11	2
Stephen Woolley	8	5	0
Jaye Davidson	8	1	1
Miranda Richardson	6	1	2
Stephen Rae	5	1	0
The Crying Game	7	1	3
