= Unforgiven =

1992 film by Clint Eastwood

- Theatrical release poster by Bill Gold
- Directed by: Clint Eastwood
- Written by: David Webb Peoples
- Produced by: Clint Eastwood
- Starring: Clint Eastwood; Gene Hackman; Morgan Freeman; Richard Harris
- Cinematography: Jack N. Green
- Edited by: Joel Cox
- Music by: Clint Eastwood; Lennie Niehaus
- Production company: Malpaso Productions
- Distributed by: Warner Bros.
- Release dates: August 3, 1992 (Mann Bruin Theater); August 7, 1992 (United States)
- Running time: 130 minutes
- Country: United States
- Language: English
- Budget: $14.4 million
- Box office: $159 million

Unforgiven is a 1992 American revisionist Western film produced and directed by Clint Eastwood from a screenplay by David Webb Peoples. It stars Eastwood as William Munny, an aging outlaw and killer who takes on one more job years after he turned to farming. The film co-stars Gene Hackman, Morgan Freeman, and Richard Harris.

Unforgiven premiered at the Mann Bruin Theater on August 3, 1992, before being released by Warner Bros. on August 7, 1992. It grossed over $159 million on a budget of $14.4 million and received widespread critical acclaim, with praise for the acting (particularly from Eastwood and Hackman), directing, editing, themes, and cinematography. The film won four Academy Awards: Best Picture, Best Director for Eastwood, Best Supporting Actor for Hackman, and Best Film Editing for Joel Cox. Eastwood was nominated for the Academy Award for Best Actor for his performance, but the Oscar went to Al Pacino for Scent of a Woman. The film was the third Western to win Best Picture, following Cimarron (1931) and Dances With Wolves (1990). Eastwood dedicated the film to directors and mentors Sergio Leone and Don Siegel.

In 2004, Unforgiven was selected for preservation in the United States National Film Registry by the Library of Congress as being deemed "culturally, historically, or aesthetically significant".

== Plot ==
In 1880, in the fictional town of Big Whiskey, Wyoming, a cowboy named Quick Mike slashes prostitute Delilah Fitzgerald's face with a knife over an insult, permanently disfiguring her. As punishment, Sheriff "Little Bill" Daggett orders Mike and his associate who was with him at the brothel, Davey Bunting, to turn over several of their ponies to Delilah's employer, Skinny DuBois, for his loss of revenue. Outraged, the prostitutes offer a $1,000 bounty for the cowboys' deaths.

In Hodgeman County, Kansas, a boastful young man visits Will Munny's hog farm. He calls himself the "Schofield Kid" and claims to be an experienced bounty hunter looking for help pursuing the cowboys. Formerly a notorious outlaw and murderer, Will is now a repentant widower raising two children. After initially refusing to help, Will realizes that his farm is failing and his children's future is in jeopardy. He recruits his friend Ned Logan, another retired outlaw, and they catch up with the Kid, who they discover is severely near-sighted.

Back in Big Whiskey, British-born gunfighter "English" Bob, an old acquaintance and rival of Little Bill's, arrives in town with his biographer W.W. Beauchamp, seeking the bounty. Enforcing the town's antigun law, Little Bill, with his deputies, disarms Bob and beats him savagely to discourage others from attempting to claim the bounty. Bob, humiliated, is banished from town the next morning, but Beauchamp stays out of a fascination with the sheriff, who debunks many of the romantic notions Beauchamp has about the Wild West. Little Bill explains to Beauchamp that the best attribute for a gunslinger is to be cool-headed under fire rather than to have the quickest draw, and to always kill the best shooter first.

Will, Ned, and the Kid arrive in town during a rainstorm and enter Skinny's saloon. While Ned and the Kid meet with the prostitutes upstairs, Little Bill confronts a feverish Will. Not realizing Will's identity, but correctly guessing that he wants the bounty, Bill confiscates his weapon and beats him. Ned and the Kid escape through a back window and take Will to an unoccupied barn outside of town, where they and the prostitutes nurse him back to health. A few days later, the trio ambush Davey. After missing Davey and shooting his horse, Ned falters and Will shoots Davey instead. Ned decides to quit and return to Kansas.

Ned is later captured and flogged to death by Little Bill to learn the whereabouts of Will and the Kid. Will takes the Kid with him to the cowboys' ranch, directing him to ambush Quick Mike in the outhouse and shoot him. After they escape, a distraught Kid drunkenly confesses he had never killed anyone before. Little Sue arrives with the reward and tells them about Ned's fate. Shocked by the news, Will begins drinking and demands the Kid's revolver. The Kid hands it over, saying that he no longer wants to be a killer, and Will sends him back to Kansas to distribute the reward.

That night Will finds Ned's corpse displayed in a coffin outside Skinny's saloon. Inside, Little Bill and his deputies are organizing a posse. Will walks in brandishing a shotgun and kills Skinny for displaying Ned's corpse. He then aims at Little Bill, but the shotgun misfires. In the ensuing gunfight, Will shoots Little Bill and several other members of the posse with the revolver. He then orders the rest of the men out. Beauchamp lingers briefly to ask how Will survived. Will replies that it was luck and scares him away. Little Bill tries and fails to take another shot at Will while lying on the floor, then bemoans his fate and curses Will, who shoots him dead. Will shouts threats as he mounts his horse and rides out of town.

A closing title card states that Will's mother-in-law found his farm abandoned years later, Will having possibly moved to San Francisco with the children. She remained at a loss to understand why her daughter married such a notorious outlaw and murderer.

== Cast ==
- Clint Eastwood as William "Will" Munny
- Gene Hackman as Sheriff "Little Bill” Daggett
- Morgan Freeman as Ned Logan
- Richard Harris as English Bob
- Jaimz Woolvett as the Schofield Kid
- Saul Rubinek as W.W. Beauchamp
- Frances Fisher as Strawberry Alice
- Anna Thomson as Delilah Fitzgerald
- David Mucci as Quick Mike
- Rob Campbell as Davey Bunting
- Anthony James as Skinny Dubois
- Tara Dawn Frederick as Little Sue
- Beverley Elliott as Silky
- Liisa Repo-Martell as Faith
- Josie Smith as Crow Creek Kate
- Cherrilene Cardinal as Sally Two Trees
- Shane Meier as William Munny Jr.
- Aline Levasseur as Penny Munny
- Ron White as Deputy Clyde Ledbetter
- Jeremy Ratchford as Deputy Andy Russell
- John Pyper-Ferguson as Deputy Charley Hecker
- Jefferson Mappin as Deputy Fatty Rossiter
- Mina E. Mina as Muddy Chandler
- Henry Kope as German Joe Schultz
- Larry Joshua as Bucky
- Ben Cardinal as Johnny Foley
- Frank C. Turner as Fuzzy
- Lochlyn Munro as Texas Slim
- Philip Hayes as Lippy MacGregor

== Production ==
=== Development ===
The film was written by David Webb Peoples, who had written the Oscar-nominated film The Day After Trinity and co-written Blade Runner with Hampton Fancher. The concept for the film dated to 1976, when it was developed under the titles The Cut-Whore Killings and The William Munny Killings. The script was originally optioned by Francis Ford Coppola, who failed to raise the money to develop the project any further.

By Eastwood's own recollection, he was given the script in the "early 80s", although he did not immediately pursue it, because according to him, "I thought I should do some other things first". In 1984, Sonia Chernus, Eastwood's long-time story editor at Malpaso Productions, sent him a scathing memo after reading the script stating that "it doesn't deserve my time or yours" and is "an insult to this company" and that Eastwood should "get rid of it FAST".

=== Casting ===
Eastwood personally phoned Harris to offer him the role of English Bob, and later said Harris was watching Eastwood's 1973 movie High Plains Drifter at the time of the phone call, leading to Harris thinking it was a prank.

Gene Hackman was hesitant to play Bill Daggett, as his daughters were upset that he was starring in too many violent films, but his agent and Eastwood convinced him to do it.

=== Filming ===
Filming took place between August 26, 1991, and November 12, 1991. Much of the film was shot in Alberta in August 1991 by director of photography Jack Green. Production designer Henry Bumstead, who had worked with Eastwood on High Plains Drifter, was hired to create the "drained, wintry look" of the Western. The railroad scenes were filmed on the Sierra Railroad in Tuolumne County, California.

== Themes ==
Like other revisionist Westerns, Unforgiven is primarily concerned with deconstructing the morally black-and-white vision of the American West, which was established by traditional works in the genre, as the script is saturated with unnerving reminders of the now teetotaling Munny's own horrific past as a drunken murderer and gunfighter, who is haunted by the lives he has taken, while the film as a whole "reflects a reverse image of classical Western tropes"; the protagonists, rather than avenging a God-fearing innocent, are hired to collect a bounty offered by a group of prostitutes. Men who claim to be fearless killers are variously exposed as being either cowards, weaklings, or self-promoting liars, while others find that they no longer have it in them to take yet another life. A writer with no concept of the harshness and cruelty of frontier life publishes stories which glorify common criminals as infallible men of honor. The law is represented by a pitiless and cynical former gun-slinger whose idea of justice is often swift and without mercy, and while the main protagonist initially tries to resist his own violent impulses, the murder of his old friend drives him to become the same cold-blooded killer he once was, suggesting that a Western hero is not necessarily "the good guy", but is instead "just the one who survived".

Film scholar Allen Redmon describes Munny's role as an antihero by stating he is "a virtuous or an injured hero [who] overcomes all obstacles to see that evil is eradicated, using whatever means necessary".

Critic Sven Mikulec called the film Eastwood's "eulogy to the Man with No Name character that made him immortal."

== Reception ==
=== Box office ===
The film debuted at the top position in its opening weekend. Its earnings of $15 million ($7,252 average from 2,071 theaters) in its opening weekend was the best-ever opening for a Clint Eastwood film at that time. This was also the highest August opening weekend, holding that record until it was surpassed a year later by The Fugitive. It spent a total of three weeks as the number-one film in North America. In its 35th weekend (April 2–4, 1993), capitalizing on its Oscar wins, the film returned to the top 10 (spending another three weeks in total there), ranking at number eight with a gross of $2.5 million ($2,969 average from 855 theaters), an improvement of 197% over the weekend before, when it made $855,188 ($1,767 average from 484 theaters). The film closed on July 15, 1993, having spent nearly a full year in theaters (343 days / 49 weeks), having earned $101 million in North America, and another $58 million internationally for a total of $159 million worldwide.

=== Critical response ===
Review aggregator Rotten Tomatoes reports an approval rating of 96% based on 109 reviews, and an average rating of 9.00/10. The website's critical consensus states: "As both director and star, Clint Eastwood strips away decades of Hollywood varnish applied to the Wild West, and emerges with a series of harshly eloquent statements about the nature of violence." Metacritic gave the film a score of 85 out of 100 based on 34 critics, indicating "universal acclaim". Audiences polled by CinemaScore gave the film an average grade of "B+" on an A+ to F scale.

Jack Methews of the Los Angeles Times described Unforgiven as "the finest classical Western to come along since perhaps John Ford's 1956 The Searchers." Richard Corliss in Time wrote that the film was "Eastwood's meditation on age, repute, courage, heroism—on all those burdens he has been carrying with such grace for decades." Gene Siskel and Roger Ebert criticized the work, though the latter gave it a positive vote, for being too long and having too many superfluous characters (such as Harris' English Bob, who enters and leaves without meeting the protagonists). Despite his initial reservations, Ebert eventually included the film in his "The Great Movies" list.

Unforgiven was named one of the 10 best films of the year on 76 critics' lists, according to a poll of the nation's top 106 film critics.

=== Accolades ===
Award	Category	Nominee(s)	Result
20/20 Awards	Best Picture	Clint Eastwood	Won
20/20 Awards	Best Director	Clint Eastwood	Nominated
20/20 Awards	Best Actor	Clint Eastwood	Nominated
20/20 Awards	Best Supporting Actor	Gene Hackman	Nominated
20/20 Awards	Best Original Screenplay	David Webb Peoples	Nominated
20/20 Awards	Best Art Direction	Henry Bumstead	Nominated
20/20 Awards	Best Cinematography	Jack N. Green	Nominated
20/20 Awards	Best Film Editing	Joel Cox	Nominated
20/20 Awards	Best Sound Design		Nominated
Academy Awards	Best Picture	Clint Eastwood	Won
Academy Awards	Best Director	Clint Eastwood	Won
Academy Awards	Best Actor	Clint Eastwood	Nominated
Academy Awards	Best Supporting Actor	Gene Hackman	Won
Academy Awards	Best Screenplay – Written Directly for the Screen	David Webb Peoples	Nominated
Academy Awards	Best Art Direction	Art Direction: Henry Bumstead; Set Decoration: Janice Blackie-Goodine	Nominated
Academy Awards	Best Cinematography	Jack N. Green	Nominated
Academy Awards	Best Film Editing	Joel Cox	Won
Academy Awards	Best Sound	Les Fresholtz, Vern Poore, Dick Alexander and Rob Young	Nominated
American Cinema Editors Awards	Best Edited Feature Film	Joel Cox	Won
ASECAN Awards	Best Foreign Film	Clint Eastwood	Won
Awards Circuit Community Awards	Best Motion Picture	Clint Eastwood	Nominated
Awards Circuit Community Awards	Best Director	Clint Eastwood	Nominated
Awards Circuit Community Awards	Best Actor in a Leading Role	Clint Eastwood	Nominated
Awards Circuit Community Awards	Best Actor in a Supporting Role	Gene Hackman	Nominated
Awards Circuit Community Awards	Best Original Screenplay	David Webb Peoples	Nominated
Awards Circuit Community Awards	Best Cinematography	Jack N. Green	Won
Awards Circuit Community Awards	Best Costume Design	Glenn Wright, Valerie T. O'Brien, Joanne Hansen and Carla Hetland	Nominated
Awards Circuit Community Awards	Best Film Editing	Joel Cox	Won
Awards Circuit Community Awards	Best Original Score	Lennie Niehaus	Nominated
Awards Circuit Community Awards	Best Production Design	Henry Bumstead and Janice Blackie-Goodine	Nominated
Awards Circuit Community Awards	Best Sound	Les Fresholtz, Vern Poore, Rick Alexander, Rob Young, Alan Robert Murray and Walter Newman	Nominated
Awards Circuit Community Awards	Best Cast Ensemble		Nominated
BMI Film & TV Awards	Film Music Award	Lennie Niehaus	Won
Boston Society of Film Critics Awards	Best Film		Won
Boston Society of Film Critics Awards	Best Supporting Actor	Gene Hackman	Won
Boston Society of Film Critics Awards	Best Cinematography	Jack N. Green	Won
British Academy Film Awards	Best Film	Clint Eastwood	Nominated
British Academy Film Awards	Best Direction	Clint Eastwood	Nominated
British Academy Film Awards	Best Actor in a Supporting Role	Gene Hackman	Won
British Academy Film Awards	Best Original Screenplay	David Webb Peoples	Nominated
British Academy Film Awards	Best Cinematography	John N. Green	Nominated
British Academy Film Awards	Best Sound	Alan Robert Murray, Walter Newman, Rob Young, Les Fresholtz, Vern Poore and Dick Alexander	Nominated
Cahiers du Cinéma	Best Film	Clint Eastwood	4th place
Chicago Film Critics Association Awards	Best Film		Nominated
Chicago Film Critics Association Awards	Best Director	Clint Eastwood	Nominated
Chicago Film Critics Association Awards	Best Actor	Clint Eastwood	Nominated
Chicago Film Critics Association Awards	Best Supporting Actor	Gene Hackman	Nominated
Chicago Film Critics Association Awards	Best Screenplay	David Webb Peoples	Nominated
Dallas–Fort Worth Film Critics Association Awards	Best Film		Won
Dallas–Fort Worth Film Critics Association Awards	Best Director	Clint Eastwood	Won
Dallas–Fort Worth Film Critics Association Awards	Best Supporting Actor	Gene Hackman	Won
Dallas–Fort Worth Film Critics Association Awards	Best Cinematography	Jack N. Green	Won
Directors Guild of America Awards	Outstanding Directorial Achievement in Motion Pictures	Clint Eastwood	Won
Edgar Allan Poe Awards	Best Motion Picture	David Webb Peoples	Nominated
Fotogramas de Plata	Best Foreign Film	Clint Eastwood	Won
Golden Globe Awards	Best Motion Picture – Drama		Nominated
Golden Globe Awards	Best Supporting Actor – Motion Picture	Gene Hackman	Won
Golden Globe Awards	Best Director – Motion Picture	Clint Eastwood	Won
Golden Globe Awards	Best Screenplay – Motion Picture	David Webb Peoples	Nominated
Hochi Film Awards	Best Foreign Language Film	Clint Eastwood	Won
Japan Academy Film Prize	Outstanding Foreign Language Film		Nominated
Kansas City Film Critics Circle Awards	Best Film		Won (Note: Tied with The Player.)
Kansas City Film Critics Circle Awards	Best Director	Clint Eastwood	Won
Kansas City Film Critics Circle Awards	Best Supporting Actor	Gene Hackman	Won
Kinema Junpo Awards	Best Foreign Language Film	Clint Eastwood	Won
London Film Critics Circle Awards	Film of the Year		Won
Los Angeles Film Critics Association Awards	Best Film		Won
Los Angeles Film Critics Association Awards	Best Director	Clint Eastwood	Won
Los Angeles Film Critics Association Awards	Best Actor	Clint Eastwood	Won
Los Angeles Film Critics Association Awards	Best Supporting Actor	Gene Hackman	Won
Los Angeles Film Critics Association Awards	Best Screenplay	David Webb Peoples	Won
Los Angeles Film Critics Association Awards	Best Cinematography	Jack N. Green	Runner-up
Mainichi Film Awards	Best Foreign Language Film	Clint Eastwood	Won
Nastro d'Argento	Best Foreign Director	Clint Eastwood	Nominated
National Board of Review Awards	Top Ten Films		6th place
National Film Preservation Board	National Film Registry		Inducted
National Society of Film Critics Awards	Best Film		Won
National Society of Film Critics Awards	Best Director	Clint Eastwood	Won
National Society of Film Critics Awards	Best Actor	Clint Eastwood	2nd place
National Society of Film Critics Awards	Best Supporting Actor	Gene Hackman	Won
National Society of Film Critics Awards	Best Screenplay	David Webb Peoples	Won
National Society of Film Critics Awards	Best Cinematography	Jack N. Green	3rd place
New York Film Critics Circle Awards	Best Film		Runner-up
New York Film Critics Circle Awards	Best Director	Clint Eastwood	Runner-up
New York Film Critics Circle Awards	Best Supporting Actor	Gene Hackman	Won
New York Film Critics Circle Awards	Best Screenplay	David Webb Peoples	Runner-up
Nikkan Sports Film Awards	Best Foreign Film		Won
Online Film & Television Association Awards	Hall of Fame – Motion Picture		Inducted
Producers Guild of America Awards	Outstanding Producer of Theatrical Motion Pictures	Clint Eastwood	Nominated
Sant Jordi Awards	Best Foreign Film	Clint Eastwood	Won
Turkish Film Critics Association Awards	Best Foreign Film		3rd place
Western Heritage Awards	Theatrical Motion Pictures		Won
Western Writers of America Awards	Best Movie Script	David Webb Peoples	Won
Writers Guild of America Awards	Best Screenplay – Written Directly for the Screen	David Webb Peoples	Nominated

American Film Institute recognition

In June 2008, Unforgiven was listed as the fourth best American film in the Western genre (behind The Searchers, High Noon, and Shane) in the American Film Institute's "AFI's 10 Top 10" list.

- AFI's 100 Years...100 Movies – No. 98
- AFI's 100 Years...100 Movies (10th Anniversary Edition) – No. 68

== Legacy ==
The music for the Unforgiven film trailer, which appeared in theaters and on some of the DVDs, was composed by Randy J. Shams and Tim Stithem in 1992. The main theme song, "Claudia's Theme", was composed by Clint Eastwood.

In 2006, the Writers Guild of America ranked Peoples' script for Unforgiven as the 30th-greatest ever written. In 2016, the Directors Guild of America ranked the film 76th on its list of The 80 Best-Directed Films since the Guild’s founding in 1936.

== Home media ==
Unforgiven was released as premium home video, on DVD and VHS, on September 24, 2002. It was released on Blu-ray Book (a Blu-ray Disc with book packaging) on February 21, 2012. Special features include an audio commentary by Clint Eastwood biographer Richard Schickel; four documentaries including "All on Accounta Pullin' a Trigger", "Eastwood & Co.: Making Unforgiven", "Eastwood...A Star", and "Eastwood on Eastwood", and more. Unforgiven was released on 4K UHD Blu-ray on May 16, 2017.

== Remake ==
A Japanese adaptation of Unforgiven, directed by Lee Sang-il and starring Ken Watanabe, was released in 2013. The plot of the 2013 version is very similar to the original, but it takes place in Japan during the Meiji period, with the main character being a samurai instead of a bandit.

== Bibliography ==
- Hughes, Howard (2009). Aim for the Heart. London: I.B. Tauris. ISBN 978-1-84511-902-7.
- McGilligan, Patrick (1999). Clint: The Life and Legend. London: HarperCollins. p. 612. ISBN 0-00-638354-8. Archived from the original on May 16, 2021.
