= Cao Cuifen =

Chinese actress

- Born: 6 April 1944 (age 82); Shanghai, China
- Occupation: Actress
- Years active: 1976–present
- Musical career
- Also known as: Cho Chui-Fan

Cao Cuifen (born 6 April 1944) is a Chinese actress. She is best known for her performance in the film Raise the Red Lantern.

== Early life ==
Cao Cuifen was born in Shanghai, China on April 6, 1944. She was admitted to the Beijing Film Academy prep school in 1960 and the undergraduate program in 1962. She left the academy due to the Cultural Revolution and did not return until 1973.

== Career ==
Cao started in her first film, Civil War, when she was 29. In order to support her film career, she decided against having children. She starred in Raise the Red Lantern and Shanghai Family in 1991, working on the films back to back. In 1995, she starred in the film, Orphan Tears, which she won several awards for her performance.

== Filmography ==
=== Film ===
Year	Title	Role	Notes
1974	Civil War		
1984	Dancing Flames		
1991	Raise the Red Lantern		
1991	Shanghai Family		
1995	Orphan Tears		
2005	Seven Flames		
2011	Love is Not Blind		

=== Television ===
Year	Title	Role	Notes
1991	Shanghai yi jia ren		
2005	Shou Wang Xing Fu		
2009	Dwelling Narrowness		
2010	The Pursuit of Happiness		
2011	Xing Fu Lai Qiao Men		
2015	Ace Agents		
2019	The Story of Minglan		
2019	Joy of Life	Grandmother Fan	
2021	Rebirth for You	Grand Empress Dowager	
