= The Player (1992 film) =

1992 film by Robert Altman

- Theatrical release poster
- Directed by: Robert Altman
- Screenplay by: Michael Tolkin
- Based on: The Player by Michael Tolkin
- Produced by: David Brown; Michael Tolkin; Nick Wechsler
- Starring: Tim Robbins; Greta Scacchi; Fred Ward; Whoopi Goldberg; Peter Gallagher; Brion James; Cynthia Stevenson
- Cinematography: Jean Lépine
- Edited by: Geraldine Peroni
- Music by: Thomas Newman
- Production companies: Avenue Pictures; Spelling Entertainment; David Brown Productions; Addis-Wechsler
- Distributed by: Fine Line Features
- Release dates: April 3, 1992 (Cleveland); April 10, 1992 (United States)
- Running time: 124 minutes
- Country: United States
- Language: English
- Budget: $8 million
- Box office: $28.9 million

The Player is a 1992 American satirical black comedy neo-noir mystery film directed by Robert Altman and written by Michael Tolkin, based on his 1988 novel. The film stars Tim Robbins, Greta Scacchi, Fred Ward, Whoopi Goldberg, Peter Gallagher, Brion James and Cynthia Stevenson, and is the story of a Hollywood film studio executive who kills an aspiring screenwriter he believes is sending him death threats.

The Player has many film references and Hollywood in-jokes, with 65 celebrities making cameo appearances in the film. Altman once stated that the film "is a very mild satire," offending no one. The film received three nominations at the 65th Academy Awards: Best Director, Best Adapted Screenplay and Best Editing. The film also won two Golden Globes, Best Motion Picture – Comedy or Musical and Best Actor – Comedy or Musical for Robbins. Although the film did not receive any acting nominations, the film is notable for having more Oscar-nominated actors than any other film, with 24.

== Plot ==
Griffin Mill is a Hollywood studio executive dating story editor Bonnie Sherow. He hears story pitches from screenwriters and decides which have the potential to be made into films, green-lighting only twelve out of 50,000 submissions every year. His job is threatened when up-and-coming exec Larry Levy begins working at the studio. Mill has also been receiving death threat postcards, assumed to be from a screenwriter whose pitch he rejected.

Mill surmises that the disgruntled writer is David Kahane, and Kahane's girlfriend June Gudmundsdottir tells him that Kahane is at the Rialto Theater in South Pasadena, at a screening of The Bicycle Thief. Mill pretends to recognize Kahane in the lobby and offers him a scriptwriting deal, hoping this will stop the threats. The two go to a nearby bar where Kahane gets intoxicated and rebuffs Mill's offer, calling him a liar and continuing to goad him about his job security at the studio. In the bar's parking lot, the two men fight. Mill goes too far and drowns Kahane in a shallow pool of water while screaming, "Keep it to yourself!" Mill then stages the crime to make it look like a botched robbery.

The next day, after Mill is late for and distracted at a meeting, studio security chief Walter Stuckel confronts him about the murder and says that the police know that he was the last one to see Kahane alive. At the end of their conversation Mill receives a fax from his stalker. Thus, Mill has killed the wrong man, and the stalker apparently knows this. Mill attends Kahane's funeral and gets into conversation with Gudmundsdottir. Detectives Avery and DeLongpre suspect Mill is guilty of murder.

Mill receives a postcard from the stalker suggesting that they meet at a hotel bar. While Mill is waiting, he is cornered by two screenwriters, Tom Oakley and Andy Sivella, who pitch Habeas Corpus, a legal drama featuring no major stars and with a depressing ending. Because Mill is not alone, his stalker does not appear. After leaving the bar, Mill receives a fax in his car, advising him to look under his raincoat. He discovers a live rattlesnake in a box and, terrified, bludgeons it with his umbrella.

Mill tells Gudmundsdottir that his near-death experience made him realize he has feelings for her. Apprehensive that Levy continues encroaching on his job, Mill invites the two writers to pitch Habeas Corpus to him, convincing Levy that the movie will be an Oscar contender. Mill's plan is to let Levy shepherd the film through production and have it flop. Mill will step in at the last moment, suggesting some changes to salvage the film's box office, letting him reclaim his position at the studio. Having persuaded Sherow to leave for New York on studio business, Mill takes Gudmundsdottir to a Hollywood awards banquet and their relationship blossoms.

After Sherow confronts Mill about his relationship with Gudmundsdottir, Mill coldly severs their relationship in front of two writers. Mill takes Gudmundsdottir to an isolated Desert Hot Springs resort and spa. In the middle of Mill and Gudmundsdottir making love, Mill confesses his role in Kahane's murder, and Gudmundsdottir responds by saying she loves him. Mill's attorney informs him that studio head Joel Levison has been fired, and that the Pasadena police want Mill to participate in a lineup. An eyewitness has come forward, but she fails to identify Mill.

One year later, studio power players are watching the end of Habeas Corpus with a new, tacked-on, upbeat ending and famous actors in the lead roles. Mill's plan to save the movie has worked and he is head of the studio. Gudmundsdottir is now Mill's wife and pregnant with his child. Sherow objects to the film's new ending and is fired by Levy. Mill rebuffs her when she appeals her termination to him. Mill receives a pitch over the phone from Levy and a man who reveals himself as the postcard writer. The man pitches an idea about a studio executive who kills a writer and gets away with murder. Recognizing the pitch as blackmail, Mill gives the writer a deal, if he can guarantee an ending in which the executive lives happily with the writer's widow. The writer's title for the film is The Player.

== Cast ==
- Tim Robbins as Griffin Mill
- Greta Scacchi as June Gudmundsdottir
- Fred Ward as Walter Stuckel
- Whoopi Goldberg as Detective Susan Avery
- Peter Gallagher as Larry Levy
- Brion James as Joel Levison
- Cynthia Stevenson as Bonnie Sherow
- Vincent D'Onofrio as David Kahane
- Dean Stockwell as Andy Sivella
- Richard E. Grant as Tom Oakley
- Sydney Pollack as Dick Mellon
- Lyle Lovett as Detective Paul DeLongpre
- Dina Merrill as Celia
- Gina Gershon as Whitney Gersh
- Angela Hall as Jan
- Jeremy Piven as Steve Reeves

== Production ==
Writer-producer Michael Tolkin initially had no intention of allowing his 1988 novel, The Player, to be adapted into a film, having written it to distance himself from his career in the movie industry. However, when producer David Brown acquired the film rights, he urged Tolkin to adapt it himself. Throughout the late 1980s and early 1990s, as they sought financing and refined the script, Tolkin ventured into directing with The Rapture (1991) and enlisted that film's producer, Nick Wechsler, to join The Player's production team. The producers encountered difficulties in selling the film, as studio executives doubted the appeal of a narrative centered on the inner workings of Hollywood filmmaking. Cary Brokaw, the CEO of Avenue Pictures, rejected the script twice, in 1989 and 1990. However, in 1991, after witnessing Altman's work on the British film Vincent & Theo (1990), Brokaw approached Altman, who eagerly embraced the project.

Principal photography for the film commenced in mid-June 1991 in Los Angeles, California, with an eight-week schedule. Before production, meticulous planning went into crafting the film's opening scene, an eight-minute unbroken tracking shot. Models were utilized to map out the shot, and the studio lot location was resurfaced to ensure smooth movement for the dolly and crane. The day before filming, the actors and crew rehearsed the scene. Altman filmed ten takes. Notably, Altman instructed actor Fred Ward, portraying a studio security chief, to incorporate references to other films renowned for their tracking shots into his dialogue to add irony to the scene.

Altman also successfully persuaded a plethora of A-list actors to make cameo appearances in the film based on his esteemed reputation in the industry. These stars agreed to participate without reviewing the script and contributed their union-scale salaries for one day of filming to the Motion Picture & Television Country House and Hospital, a retirement community for industry professionals. Despite the large ensemble, the film was completed within a budget ranging from approximately $8 to $10 million. Funding for the project came from Avenue Pictures' "internal funds" and the pre-sale of foreign rights to Spelling International. Furthermore, principal actors agreed to defer their wages. Chevy Chase was interested in playing the role of Griffin Mill, but Warner Bros. didn't want Chase to star in the film.

Despite the difficulties of funding, the film's distribution rights were highly sought after by nearly every major Hollywood studio. Eventually, Fine Line Features, a division of New Line Cinema, secured the rights with a guarantee of $5.1 million. President of Fine Line Features, Ira Deutchman, stated that the film would be promoted as a comedy to attract audiences who might not typically be interested in a movie about Hollywood. Release dates were strategically planned to coincide with the 64th Academy Awards in March 1992, aiming to capitalize on the ceremony's publicity and generate word-of-mouth buzz. Preview screenings were positive. The filmmakers hoped audiences would be drawn to the film's story rather than its celebrity cameos; therefore, Altman insisted on not featuring the actors' names in advertisements.

== Reception ==
On Rotten Tomatoes, the film has an approval rating of 97% based on 66 reviews, with an average rating of 8.90/10. The site's critical consensus reads: "Bitingly cynical without succumbing to bitterness, The Player is one of the all-time great Hollywood satires — and an ensemble-driven highlight of the Altman oeuvre." On Metacritic, the film has a score of 86 out of 100, based on 20 critics, indicating "universal acclaim".

Roger Ebert gave the film four stars out of four and called it:

a smart movie, and a funny one. It is also absolutely of its time. After the savings and loan scandals, after Michael Milken, after junk bonds and stolen pension funds, here is a movie that uses Hollywood as a metaphor for the avarice of the 1980s. It is the movie The Bonfire of the Vanities wanted to be.

Gene Siskel also gave the film a perfect four-star grade and wrote, "If you knew nothing and cared nothing about the movie business, you can still appreciate The Player as a ripping good thriller, too." Vincent Canby of The New York Times wrote, "Robert Altman has not really been away. Yet his new Hollywood satire titled The Player is so entertaining, so flip and so genially irreverent that it seems to announce the return of the great gregarious film maker whose Nashville remains one of the classics of the 1970's".

Todd McCarthy of Variety wrote: "Mercilessly satiric yet good-natured, this enormously entertaining slam dunk represents a remarkable American come-back for eternal maverick Robert Altman." Terrence Rafferty of The New Yorker called it "a brilliant dark comedy about the death of American filmmaking," adding: "In this picture Altman is doing one of his specialties: exploring an odd American subculture—revealing its distinctive textures and explicating the peculiar principles of social intercourse which keep it functioning. But when his idiosyncratic style of anthropological realism is applied to the tight community of Hollywood 'players' it has an almost hallucinatory effect." Peter Rainer of the Los Angeles Times wrote that "Altman has made a movie that's supremely deft and pleasurable. As if to taunt his detractors, he even 'tells a story' this time, and he does a better job of it than the hacks who have been getting work when he couldn't."

The Player was Altman's comeback to making films in Hollywood. Altman was praised for the sex scene in which Robbins and Scacchi were filmed from the neck up. Scacchi later claimed that Altman had wanted a nude scene, but that it was her refusal which led to the final form. The editing of The Player by Geraldine Peroni was honored by a nomination for the Academy Award for Best Film Editing. In 2004, Tony Sloman wrote an appreciation of the film's editing:

The Player is a marvellous example of collaborative editing, Peroni matching Altman's tone with exactitude. Early on, a cut from a zoom-in to the gun in Humphrey Bogart's hand on a postcard sent to Tim Robbins is perfectly successively matched with what appears to be a black frame, in which a reveal shows that it's an open drawer in which the postcard has been placed. Another felicitous sequence is the one in the Pasadena police station, where the Robbins character is arraigned as Lyle Lovett swats a fly and Whoopi Goldberg and her associates ridicule Robbins with laughter. This is beautifully edited; well-shot, too, but the rhythm is built in the cutting.

The Player was placed on 80 critics' year-end best lists, second only to Howards End in 1992.

=== Awards and nominations ===
Award	Category	Nominee(s)	Result
20/20 Awards	Best Picture		Nominated
20/20 Awards	Best Director	Robert Altman	Nominated
20/20 Awards	Best Actor	Tim Robbins	Nominated
20/20 Awards	Best Adapted Screenplay	Michael Tolkin	Won
20/20 Awards	Best Film Editing	Geraldine Peroni	Nominated
Academy Awards	Best Director	Robert Altman	Nominated
Academy Awards	Best Screenplay – Based on Material Previously Produced or Published	Michael Tolkin	Nominated
Academy Awards	Best Film Editing	Geraldine Peroni	Nominated
American Cinema Editors Awards	Best Edited Feature Film	Geraldine Peroni	Nominated
American Comedy Awards	Funniest Supporting Actress in a Motion Picture	Whoopi Goldberg	Nominated
Australian Film Institute Awards	Best Foreign Film	Michael Tolkin, David Brown and Nick Wechsler	Nominated
Awards Circuit Community Awards	Best Director	Robert Altman	Nominated
Awards Circuit Community Awards	Best Adapted Screenplay	Ruth Prawer Jhabvala	Nominated
Bodil Awards	Best Non-European Film	Robert Altman	Won
Boston Society of Film Critics Awards	Best Director	Robert Altman	Won
British Academy Film Awards	Best Film	David Brown, Michael Tolkin, Nick Wechsler and Robert Altman	Nominated
British Academy Film Awards	Best Direction	Robert Altman	Won
British Academy Film Awards	Best Actor in a Leading Role	Tim Robbins	Nominated
British Academy Film Awards	Best Adapted Screenplay	Michael Tolkin	Won
British Academy Film Awards	Best Editing	Geraldine Peroni	Nominated
Cannes Film Festival	Palme d'Or	Robert Altman	Nominated
Cannes Film Festival	Best Director	Robert Altman	Won
Cannes Film Festival	Best Actor	Tim Robbins	Won
César Awards	Best Foreign Film	Robert Altman	Nominated
Chicago Film Critics Association Awards	Best Film		Nominated
Chicago Film Critics Association Awards	Best Director	Robert Altman	Won
Chicago Film Critics Association Awards	Best Actor	Tim Robbins	Nominated
Chicago Film Critics Association Awards	Best Screenplay	Michael Tolkin	Won
Dallas–Fort Worth Film Critics Association Awards	Best Film		Nominated
Directors Guild of America Awards	Outstanding Directorial Achievement in Motion Pictures	Robert Altman	Nominated
Edgar Allan Poe Awards	Best Motion Picture	Michael Tolkin	Won
Golden Globe Awards	Best Motion Picture – Musical or Comedy		Won
Golden Globe Awards	Best Actor in a Motion Picture – Musical or Comedy	Tim Robbins	Won
Golden Globe Awards	Best Director – Motion Picture	Robert Altman	Nominated
Golden Globe Awards	Best Screenplay – Motion Picture	Michael Tolkin	Nominated
Independent Spirit Awards	Best Feature		Won
Kansas City Film Critics Circle Awards	Best Film		Won (Note: Tied with Unforgiven.)
London Film Critics Circle Awards	Director of the Year	Robert Altman	Won
London Film Critics Circle Awards	Screenwriter of the Year	Michael Tolkin	Won
Los Angeles Film Critics Association Awards	Best Film		Runner-up
Los Angeles Film Critics Association Awards	Best Director	Robert Altman	Runner-up
Los Angeles Film Critics Association Awards	Best Supporting Actor	Sydney Pollack	Runner-up
Nastro d'Argento	Best Foreign Director	Robert Altman	Won
National Board of Review Awards	Top Ten Films		5th Place
National Society of Film Critics Awards	Best Film		3rd Place
National Society of Film Critics Awards	Best Director	Robert Altman	2nd Place
National Society of Film Critics Awards	Best Screenplay	Michael Tolkin	3rd Place
New York Film Critics Circle Awards	Best Film		Won
New York Film Critics Circle Awards	Best Director	Robert Altman	Won
New York Film Critics Circle Awards	Best Screenplay	Michael Tolkin	2nd Place
New York Film Critics Circle Awards	Best Cinematographer	Jean Lépine	Won
PEN Center USA West Literary Awards	Best Screenplay	Michael Tolkin	Won
Southeastern Film Critics Association Awards	Best Picture		2nd Place
Southeastern Film Critics Association Awards	Best Director	Robert Altman	Won
Turkish Film Critics Association Awards	Best Foreign Film		2nd Place
USC Scripter Awards		Michael Tolkin	Nominated
Writers Guild of America Awards	Best Screenplay – Based on Material Previously Produced or Published	Michael Tolkin	Won

== Legacy ==
In 1997, the film was adapted into a television pilot that wasn't picked up. It starred Patrick Dempsey, Michael Parks, Arye Gross, Shelley Duvall, Natasha Gregson Wagner, Jennifer Grey, and Seymour Cassel.

In 2015, Entertainment Weekly's 25th anniversary year, it named The Player in its list of the 25 best movies since the magazine's beginnings. Rolling Stone listed The Player as one of the best movies of the 90's.

A character named Griffin Mill appears in the 2025 TV series The Studio, played by Bryan Cranston.

== See also ==
- List of films featuring fictional films
