= Jaye Davidson =

English American model and actor (born 1968)

- Born: Alfred Amey; Riverside, California, U.S.
- Occupations: Actor, model
- Years active: 1992–1995
- Spouse: Thomas Clarke (m. 2017)

Jaye Davidson (born Alfred Amey) is an English model, fashion stylist, and retired actor. He made his acting debut as Dil in the thriller film The Crying Game (1992), for which he received an Academy Award nomination for Best Supporting Actor. Following his breakthrough, he portrayed the villainous Ra in the commercially successful science fiction film Stargate (1994). Davidson retired from acting afterwards, disliking the fame that it brought him.

== Early life ==
Davidson was born in Riverside, California, in the United States. He was raised in Hertfordshire, England, where he moved when he was three. His father is from Ghana and his mother is from England. Davidson is gay. During his acting career, he said that his androgynous look alienated him within the gay community. He stated that gay men "love very masculine men. And I'm not a very masculine person. I'm reasonably thin. I have long hair, which isn't very popular with gay men".

== Career ==
Davidson made his acting debut in the thriller film The Crying Game (1992). The film's funders wanted director Neil Jordan to cast a woman to play the transgender character Dil, believing that it would be impossible to find an androgynous male actor who could pass as female. Nevertheless, Davidson - who had no prior professional acting experience - was invited to audition for The Crying Game after being discovered at a wrap party for Derek Jarman's Edward II. He was cast in the role of Dil. The film was a critical and commercial success. It was marketed as having a surprise twist, in which the main character Fergus (played by Stephen Rea) discovers that Dil is transgender. The scene required full-frontal nudity on Davidson's part. Rea later said: "If Jaye hadn't been a completely convincing woman, my character would have looked stupid." When the film was released, Miramax requested that reviewers keep Davidson's sex a secret.

For his work in The Crying Game, Davidson was nominated for the Academy Award for Best Supporting Actor and for the BAFTA Award for Best Actor in a Supporting Role in 1993. Davidson also received nominations for the Chicago Film Critics Association Award for Most Promising Actor and the Chicago Film Critics Association Award for Most Promising Actress in 1993.

Davidson starred as Ra, an alien impersonating a god, in the 1994 science fiction adventure film Stargate. He was surprised when his request to be paid $1 million was accepted.

Davidson later retired from acting, stating that he "genuinely hated the fame" he was receiving. He became more involved in modelling and has since worked on several high-profile photo shoots, in addition to working as a fashion stylist in Paris.

== Personal life ==
Davidson married Thomas Clarke in 2017.

== Filmography ==
Film work by Jaye Davidson
Year	Title	Role	Director	Notes
1992	The Crying Game	Dil	Neil Jordan	National Board of Review Award for Most Auspicious Debut; Nominated – National Society of Film Critics Award for Best Supporting Actor; Nominated – Academy Award for Best Supporting Actor; Nominated – BAFTA Award for Best Actor in a Supporting Role; Nominated – Chicago Film Critics Association Award for Most Promising Actor; Nominated – Chicago Film Critics Association Award for Most Promising Actress
1994	Stargate	Ra	Roland Emmerich	
1994	Jiggery Pokery	Jo	Sophie Muller	Television film
1995	Catwalk	Himself	Robert Leacock	Documentary
2009	The Borghilde Project	Nazi photographer	Myles Grimsdale	
