= Husbands and Wives =

1992 comedy-drama film by Woody Allen

- Theatrical film poster
- Directed by: Woody Allen
- Written by: Woody Allen
- Produced by: Robert Greenhut
- Starring: Woody Allen; Blythe Danner; Judy Davis; Mia Farrow; Juliette Lewis; Liam Neeson; Sydney Pollack
- Cinematography: Carlo Di Palma
- Edited by: Susan E. Morse
- Production company: TriStar Pictures
- Distributed by: TriStar Pictures
- Release dates: September 14, 1992 (TIFF); September 18, 1992 (United States)
- Running time: 108 minutes
- Country: United States
- Language: English
- Budget: $20 million (estimate)
- Box office: $10.6 million

Husbands and Wives is a 1992 American comedy-drama film written and directed by Woody Allen. The film stars Allen, Mia Farrow, Sydney Pollack, Judy Davis, Lysette Anthony, Juliette Lewis, Liam Neeson and Blythe Danner. The film debuted shortly after the end of Allen and Farrow's romantic and professional partnership, and was the last of their 13 films together. The movie is filmed by Carlo Di Palma with a handheld camera style and features documentary-like interviews with the characters interspersed with the story.

Husbands and Wives, released by TriStar Pictures, was Allen's first film as sole director for a studio other than United Artists or Orion Pictures (both now part of Metro-Goldwyn-Mayer) since Take the Money and Run (1969). It received critical acclaim despite being a box-office failure, and was nominated for two Academy Awards, Best Supporting Actress (Judy Davis) and Best Original Screenplay (Woody Allen).

== Plot ==
The film follows two couples: Jack and Sally, and Gabe and Judy. It starts with Jack and Sally visiting Gabe and Judy's apartment to announce their separation. Gabe is shocked, but Judy takes it personally and is deeply hurt. The four of them go out to dinner at a Chinese restaurant, still confused about the situation.

A few weeks later, Sally visits a colleague's apartment to begin an evening at the opera and dinner. She calls Jack from the colleague's phone and accuses him of having an affair during their marriage after learning that he has met someone new.

Judy and Gabe meet Jack's new girlfriend, Sam, an aerobics trainer. While Judy and Sam go shopping, Gabe calls Sam a "cocktail waitress" and tells Jack that he's crazy for leaving Sally for her. Later, Judy introduces Michael, her colleague from the magazine, to Sally. They begin dating, but Sally is unsatisfied with the relationship.

Meanwhile, Gabe has developed a friendship with Rain, a young student of his, who reads and criticizes his novel manuscript. They share a romantic moment at her 21st birthday party, but Gabe decides they should not pursue it any further.

At a party, Jack learns that Sally is seeing someone else and becomes jealous. He and Sam argue intensely, and Jack drives home to find Sally in bed with Michael. He asks Sally to give their marriage another chance, but she refuses.

Less than two weeks later, Jack and Sally are back together and meet Gabe and Judy for dinner. Afterward, Judy and Gabe argue about her not sharing her poetry, and Gabe makes a failed pass at her. Judy tells him she thinks the relationship is over, and a week later Gabe moves out. Judy begins seeing Michael.

In the end, Jack and Sally are still struggling with marital problems, but accept them as the price of remaining together. Gabe is living alone and not dating to avoid hurting anyone, including himself. The film ends with Gabe asking the unseen documentary crew whether he can leave.

== Cast ==
The cast includes (in credits order):

- Woody Allen as Gabe Roth
- Mia Farrow as Judy Roth
- Judy Davis as Sally Simmons
- Sydney Pollack as Jack Simmons
- Juliette Lewis as Rain
- Liam Neeson as Michael Gates
- Lysette Anthony as Sam
- Cristi Conaway as Shawn Grainger, call girl
- Timothy Jerome as Paul, Sally's date
- Ron Rifkin as Richard, Rain's analyst
- Bruce Jay Friedman as Peter Styles
- Jeffrey Kurland as interviewer-narrator (voice)
- Benno Schmidt as Judy's ex-husband
- Nick Metropolis as TV scientist
- Rebecca Glenn as Gail
- Galaxy Craze as Harriet
- John Doumanian as Hamptons' party guest
- Gordon Rigsby as Hamptons' party guest
- Ilene Blackman as Receptionist
- Blythe Danner as Rain's mother
- Brian McConnachie as Rain's father
- Ron August as Rain's ex lover
- John Bucher as Rain's ex lover
- Matthew Flint as Carl, Rain's Boyfriend

== Soundtrack ==
- "What Is This Thing Called Love" (1929) by Cole Porter, performed by Leo Reisman and His Orchestra
- "West Coast Blues" (1960), written and performed by Wes Montgomery
- Symphony No. 9 in D, I. Andante Commodo (1909–10) by Gustav Mahler, performed by John Barbirolli and the Berlin Philharmonic
- "That Old Feeling" (1937) by Lew Brown (lyrics) and Sammy Fain (music), performed by Stan Getz and Gerry Mulligan
- "Top Hat, White Tie and Tails" (1935) by Irving Berlin, performed by Bernie Leighton
- "Makin' Whoopee" (1928), by Walter Donaldson (music) and Gus Kahn (lyrics), performed by Bernie Leighton
- "The Song Is You" (1932), by Jerome Kern (music) and Oscar Hammerstein II (lyrics), performed by Bernie Leighton

== Philosophical interpretation ==
The scene in which Sally, while having sex with Michael, begins to mentally compare (through voiceover narration) him and her husband Jack, as well as numerous friends and acquaintances, to hedgehogs and foxes, is an allusion to British philosopher Isaiah Berlin's 1953 essay The Hedgehog and the Fox. In that book, Berlin contrasts two distinct types of thinker in the Western literary and philosophical tradition: those he calls "hedgehogs"—"who relate everything to a single central vision, one system"—and those he calls "foxes"—"who pursue many ends, often unrelated and even contradictory... related to no moral or aesthetic principle".

== Reception ==
=== Box office ===
Husbands and Wives opened on September 18, 1992 in 865 theatres, where it earned $3,520,550 ($4,070 per screen) in its opening weekend. It went on to gross $10.5 million in North America during its theatrical run. The film was also screened at the 1992 Toronto Festival of Festivals.

=== Critical response ===
Husbands and Wives opened to acclaim from film critics. On the review aggregator website Rotten Tomatoes, 93% of 43 critics' reviews are positive, with an average rating of 8.1/10. The website's consensus reads: "Husbands and Wives is a blistering, emotionally raw snapshot of two marriages self-destructing." Metacritic, which uses a weighted average, assigned the film a score of 84 out of 100, based on 30 critics, indicating "universal acclaim".

Peter Travers of Rolling Stone called Husbands and Wives "a defining film for these emotionally embattled times; it's classic Woody Allen." In Variety, Todd McCarthy called the film as "a full meal, as it deals with the things of life with intelligence, truthful drama and rueful humor."

Vincent Canby of The New York Times called it "a very fine, sometimes brutal comedy about a small group of contemporary New Yorkers, each an edgy, self-analyzing achiever who goes through life without much joy, but who finds a certain number of cracked satisfactions along the way." He added, "Husbands and Wives—the entire Allen canon, for that matter—represents a kind of personal cinema for which there is no precedent in modern American movies. Even our best directors are herd animals. Mr. Allen is a rogue: he travels alone." Roger Ebert of the Chicago Sun-Times wrote, "...what Husbands and Wives argues is that many 'rational' relationships are actually not as durable as they seem, because somewhere inside every person is a child crying me! me! me! We say we want the other person to be happy. What we mean is, we want them to be happy with us, just as we are, on our terms."

In 2016, Time Out contributors ranked Husbands and Wives fifth among Allen's films, with Keith Uhlich praising its "trenchant examination of long-term relationships on the downswing". The same year, Robbie Collin and Tim Robey of The Daily Telegraph listed Husbands and Wives as Allen's seventh-best film, calling it "a rapid marvel of four-way characterization" and the opening scene "one of Allen's most vividly written, shot and acted scenes ever".

=== Accolades ===
Award	Category	Nominee(s)	Result
20/20 Awards	Best Director	Woody Allen	Nominated
20/20 Awards	Best Supporting Actress	Judy Davis	Won
20/20 Awards	Best Original Screenplay	Woody Allen	Nominated
Academy Awards	Best Supporting Actress	Judy Davis	Nominated
Academy Awards	Best Screenplay – Written Directly for the Screen	Woody Allen	Nominated
American Comedy Awards	Funniest Supporting Actress in a Motion Picture	Judy Davis	Nominated
Artios Awards	Best Casting for Feature Film – Comedy	Juliet Taylor	Nominated
Australian Film Institute Awards	Best Foreign Film	Robert Greenhut	Nominated
Awards Circuit Community Awards	Best Actress in a Supporting Role	Judy Davis	Nominated
Boston Society of Film Critics Awards	Best Supporting Actress	Judy Davis	Won
British Academy Film Awards	Best Actress in a Leading Role	Judy Davis	Nominated
British Academy Film Awards	Best Original Screenplay	Woody Allen	Won
Cahiers du Cinéma	Best Film	Woody Allen	4th Place
César Awards	Best Foreign Film	Woody Allen	Nominated
Chicago Film Critics Association Awards	Best Supporting Actress	Judy Davis	Won
Dallas–Fort Worth Film Critics Association Awards	Best Supporting Actress	Judy Davis	Won
Golden Globe Awards	Best Supporting Actress – Motion Picture	Judy Davis	Nominated
Guldbagge Awards	Best Foreign Film		Won
Kansas City Film Critics Circle Awards	Best Supporting Actress	Judy Davis	Won
London Film Critics Circle Awards	Actress of the Year	Judy Davis	Won
Los Angeles Film Critics Association Awards	Best Supporting Actor	Sydney Pollack	Runner-up
Los Angeles Film Critics Association Awards	Best Supporting Actress	Judy Davis	Won
National Board of Review Awards	Best Supporting Actress	Judy Davis	Won
National Society of Film Critics Awards	Best Supporting Actress	Judy Davis	Won
New York Film Critics Circle Awards	Best Supporting Actress	Judy Davis	Runner-up
Southeastern Film Critics Association Awards	Best Picture		6th Place
Southeastern Film Critics Association Awards	Best Supporting Actress	Judy Davis	Won
Turkish Film Critics Association Awards	Best Foreign Film		10th Place
Writers Guild of America Awards	Best Screenplay – Written Directly for the Screen	Woody Allen	Nominated
