= National Board of Review Awards 1992 =

Annual US film awards ceremony

64th National Board of Review Awards

Best Picture:
Howards End

The 64th National Board of Review Awards, honoring the best in filmmaking in 1992, were announced by the National Board of Review on 16 December 1992 and given on 22 February 1993.

== Top 10 films ==
1. Howards End
2. The Crying Game
3. Glengarry Glen Ross
4. A Few Good Men
5. The Player
6. Unforgiven
7. One False Move
8. Peter's Friends
9. Bob Roberts
10. Malcolm X

== Top foreign Films ==
1. Indochine
2. Raise the Red Lantern
3. Tous les matins du monde
4. Mediterraneo
5. Like Water for Chocolate

== Winners ==
- Best Actor:
  - Jack Lemmon - Glengarry Glen Ross
- Best Actress:
  - Emma Thompson - Howards End
- Best Director:
  - James Ivory - Howards End
- Best Documentary Feature:
  - Brother's Keeper
- Best Film:
  - Howards End
- Best Foreign Film:
  - Indochine, France
- Best Supporting Actor:
  - Jack Nicholson - A Few Good Men
- Best Supporting Actress:
  - Judy Davis - Husbands and Wives
- Career Achievement Award
  - Shirley Temple
