= 1992 Los Angeles Film Critics Association Awards =

Annual US film awards ceremony

18th LAFCA Awards
- Date: December 12, 1992

Highlights
- Best Picture: Unforgiven

The 18th Los Angeles Film Critics Association Awards, honoring the best in film for 1992, were given on 12 December 1992.

== Winners ==
- Best Picture:
  - Unforgiven
  - Runner-up: The Player
- Best Director:
  - Clint Eastwood – Unforgiven
  - Runner-up: Robert Altman – The Player
- Best Actor:
  - Clint Eastwood – Unforgiven
  - Runner-up: Denzel Washington – Malcolm X
- Best Actress:
  - Emma Thompson – Howards End
  - Runner-up: Alfre Woodard – Passion Fish
- Best Supporting Actor:
  - Gene Hackman – Unforgiven
  - Runner-up: Sydney Pollack – Husbands and Wives, Death Becomes Her, and The Player
- Best Supporting Actress:
  - Judy Davis – Husbands and Wives
  - Runner-up: Miranda Richardson – The Crying Game, Damage, and Enchanted April
- Best Screenplay:
  - David Webb Peoples – Unforgiven
  - Runner-up: Neil Jordan – The Crying Game
- Best Cinematography:
  - Zhao Fai – Raise the Red Lantern (Da hong deng long gao gao gua)
  - Runner-up: Jack N. Green – Unforgiven
- Best Music Score:
  - Zbigniew Preisner – Damage
  - Runner-up: Mark Isham – A River Runs Through It
- Best Foreign Film:
  - The Crying Game • UK/Japan
  - Runner-up: Raise the Red Lantern (Da hong deng long gao gao gua) • China/Hong Kong/Taiwan
- Best Non-Fiction Film (tie):
  - Black Harvest
  - Threat
- Best Animation:
  - Aladdin
- Experimental/Independent Film/Video Award:
  - Sadie Benning – It Wasn’t Love
- New Generation Award:
  - Carl Franklin – One False Move
- Career Achievement Award:
  - Budd Boetticher
