= Boston Society of Film Critics Awards 1992 =

Annual US film awards ceremony

13th BSFC Awards

December, 1992

Best Film:
Unforgiven

The 13th Boston Society of Film Critics Awards honored the best filmmaking of 1992. The awards were given in 1992.

== Winners ==
- Best Film:
  - Unforgiven
- Best Actor:
  - Denzel Washington – Malcolm X
- Best Actress:
  - Emma Thompson – Howards End
- Best Supporting Actor:
  - Gene Hackman – Unforgiven
- Best Supporting Actress:
  - Judy Davis – Husbands and Wives and Where Angels Fear to Tread
- Best Director:
  - Robert Altman – The Player
- Best Screenplay:
  - Neil Jordan – The Crying Game
- Best Cinematography:
  - Jack N. Green – Unforgiven
- Best Documentary:
  - Brother's Keeper
- Best Foreign-Language Film:
  - Raise the Red Lantern (Da hong deng long gao gao gua) • China/Hong Kong/Taiwan
