= 1992 National Society of Film Critics Awards =

Annual US film awards ceremony

27th NSFC Awards

January 3, 1993

Best Film:
Unforgiven

The 27th National Society of Film Critics Awards, given on 3 January 1993, honored the best filmmaking of 1992.

== Winners ==
=== Best Picture ===
1. Unforgiven
2. The Crying Game
3. The Player

=== Best Director ===
1. Clint Eastwood – Unforgiven
2. Robert Altman – The Player
3. Neil Jordan – The Crying Game

=== Best Actor ===
1. Stephen Rea – The Crying Game
2. Clint Eastwood – Unforgiven
3. Denzel Washington – Malcolm X

=== Best Actress ===
1. Emma Thompson – Howards End
2. Susan Sarandon – Lorenzo's Oil and Light Sleeper
3. Gong Li – Raise the Red Lantern (Da hong deng long gao gao gua)
3. Pernilla August – The Best Intentions (Den goda viljan)

=== Best Supporting Actor ===
1. Gene Hackman – Unforgiven
2. Jaye Davidson – The Crying Game
3. Delroy Lindo – Malcolm X

=== Best Supporting Actress ===
1. Judy Davis – Husbands and Wives
2. Miranda Richardson – The Crying Game, Damage and Enchanted April
3. Vanessa Redgrave – Howards End

=== Best Screenplay ===
1. David Webb Peoples – Unforgiven
2. Neil Jordan – The Crying Game
3. Michael Tolkin – The Player

=== Best Cinematography ===
1. Zhao Fei – Raise the Red Lantern (Da hong deng long gao gao gua)
2. Jean de Segonzac – Laws of Gravity
3. Jack N. Green – Unforgiven

=== Best Foreign Language Film ===
1. Raise the Red Lantern (Da hong deng long gao gao gua)
2. The Match Factory Girl (Tulitikkutehtaan tyttö)
3. The Best Intentions (Den goda viljan)

=== Best Documentary ===
1. American Dream
2. Brother's Keeper
3. A Brief History of Time

=== Special Citation ===
- Another Girl, Another Planet
