= 45th Writers Guild of America Awards =

45th WGA Awards
- Date: 1993
- Organized by: Writers Guild of America, East and the Writers Guild of America, West

The 45th Writers Guild of America Awards honored the best television, and film writers of 1992. Winners were announced in 1993.

== Winners and nominees ==
=== Film ===
Winners are listed first highlighted in boldface.

**Best Screenplay Written Directly for the Screen**: **The Crying Game, Written by Neil Jordan**; Husbands and Wives, Written by Woody Allen; Lorenzo's Oil, Written by George Miller, and Nick Enright; Passion Fish, Written by John Sayles; Unforgiven, Written by David Webb Peoples	**Best Screenplay Based on Material Previously Produced or Published**: **The Player, Screenplay by Michael Tolkin; based on his novel**; Howards End, Screenplay by Ruth Prawer Jhabvala; based on the novel by E.M. Forster; Enchanted April, Screenplay by Peter Barnes; based on the novel by Elizabeth von Arnim; Glengarry Glen Ross, Screenplay by David Mamet; based on his play; Scent of a Woman, Screenplay by Bo Goldman; based on the novel by Giovani Arpino

=== Television ===
**Episodic Comedy**: **"Uh-Oh: Part 2 & 3" – Murphy Brown (CBS) – Diane English, and Korky Siamis**; "When Irish Eyes Are Smiling" – Brooklyn Bridge (CBS) – Gary David Goldberg; "The Boyfriend & The Boyfriend" – Seinfeld (NBC) – Larry David, and Larry Levin; "The Stranded" – Seinfeld (NBC) – Larry David, Jerry Seinfeld, and Matt Goldman; "The Parking Space" – Seinfeld (NBC) – Larry David, and Greg Daniels	**Episodic Drama**: **"Amazing Grace" – I'll Fly Away (NBC) – Henry Bromell**; "Coming Home" – I'll Fly Away (NBC) – Kevin Arkadie; "Seoul Mates" – Northern Exposure (CBS) – Diane Frolov, and Andrew Schneider; "Burning Down the House" – Northern Exposure (CBS) – Robin Green
**Daytime Serials**: **One Life to Live (ABC) – Michael Malone, Josh Griffith, Jean Passanante, Dorothy Gilbert Goldstone, Katie Rogin, Alan Bernstein, Eleanor Mancusi, Juliette Mann, Neal Bell, Lloyd 'Lucky' Gold, Becky Cole, David Smilow, Fran Myers, Roger Newman, William M. Hoffman, Jeffrey Sweet, Alan Gelb**; Santa Barbara (NBC) – Pamela K. Long, Samuel D. Ratcliffe, Michele Val Jean, Christopher Dunn, Meg Bennett, Thom Racina, Bettina F. Bradbury, Millee Taggart, Jerome Dobson, Bridget Dobson, Mary Dobson, Lynda Myles, Gary Tomlin	**Original Long Form**: **"SNAFU" – Homefront (ABC) – Lynn Marie Latham, and Bernard Lechowick**
**Adapted Long Form**: **The Broken Cord (ABC) – Ann Beckett**; Miss Rose White (NBC) – Anna Sandor	**Children's Script**: **"Pretzelmania" – Adventures in Wonderland (The Disney Channel) – Daryl Busby, and Susan Amerikaner**; "What Makes Rabbit Run?" – Adventures in Wonderland (The Disney Channel) – Daryl Busby, and Tom J. Astle; "Public Law 106: The Becky Bell Story" – Lifestories: Families in Crisis (HBO) – Bruce Harmon; "Two Teens and a Baby" – CBS Schoolbreak Special (CBS) – Carol Starr Schneider; "The Case of the Calpurnian Kugle Caper" – Mathnet (PBS) – David D. Connell, James F. Thurman, Michael Winship, and Susan Kim
**Variety - Musical, Award, Tribute, Special Event**: **Medusa: Dare to Be Truthful (Showtime) – Julie Brown, and Charlie Coffey**

==== Documentary ====
**Documentary – Other Than Current Events**
- **"LBJ" – American Experience (PBS) – David Grubin**
  - "Duke Ellington: Reminiscing in Tempo" – American Experience) (PBS) – Robert Levi, and Geoffrey C. Ward

=== Radio ===
**Outstanding Radio Comedy**
- **The Morning Show – Sarit Catz, and Gloria Ketterer**

=== Special awards ===
Laurel Award for Screenwriting Achievement
**Horton Foote**
Laurel Award for TV Writing Achievement
**Norman Lear**
Valentine Davies Award
**True Boardman**
Morgan Cox Award
**Irma Kalish**
Paul Selvin Award
**Cynthia Whitcomb**
