= Raise the Red Lantern =

1991 Chinese-Hong Kong film directed by Zhang Yimou

- Chinese theatrical release poster
- Traditional Chinese: 大紅燈籠高高掛
- Simplified Chinese: 大红灯笼高高挂
- Literal meaning: Big red lanterns are hung high
- Hanyu Pinyin: Dà Hóng Dēnglong Gāogāo Guà
- Directed by: Zhang Yimou
- Written by: Ni Zhen
- Based on: Raise the Red Lantern (Wives and Concubines) by Su Tong
- Produced by: Hou Hsiao-hsien; Chiu Fu-sheng; Zhang Wenze
- Starring: Gong Li; Ma Jingwu; He Saifei; Cao Cuifen; Jin Shuyuan
- Cinematography: Zhao Fei
- Edited by: Du Yuan
- Music by: Zhao Jiping; Naoki Tachikawa
- Production companies: Era International; China Film Co-Production Corporation
- Distributed by: Orion Classics
- Release date: 10 September 1991 (Venice)
- Running time: 125 minutes
- Countries: China; Hong Kong
- Language: Mandarin
- Budget: $1 million
- Box office: $2.6 million (United States) $3 million+ (Italy), $2 million+ (France) $11 million+ (HK$85million+) (Outside Asia)

Raise the Red Lantern is a 1991 period drama film directed by Zhang Yimou and starring Gong Li. It is an adaptation by Ni Zhen of the 1990 novella Raise the Red Lantern (originally Wives and Concubines) by Su Tong. A Chinese-Hong Kong co-production, the film was later adapted into a ballet of the same title by the National Ballet of China, also directed by Zhang. Set during the Warlord Era in the 1920s, the film tells the story of a young woman who becomes the fourth wife of a wealthy man. It was the fourth of nine collaborations between Zhang and Gong. The film was shot in the Qiao Family Compound near the ancient city of Pingyao, in Shanxi Province.

Raise the Red Lantern received widespread critical acclaim. It was entered into the 48th Venice International Film Festival, where it was nominated for the Golden Lion and won the Silver Lion. It was also nominated for the Academy Award for Best Foreign Language Film and won the BAFTA Award for Best Film Not in the English Language. It is considered an important work in the so-called Fifth Generation movement of Chinese cinema and is one of the most internationally highly-regarded films from mainland China overall; it appeared on The New York Times's list of the 1000 best films ever made in 2004 and on the BBC's list of the 100 greatest foreign language films in 2018.

== Plot ==
The film is set in Republican China during the 1920s. Nineteen-year-old Songlian (Gong Li), an educated woman whose father has recently died and left the family bankrupt, is forced by her stepmother to marry into the wealthy Chen family, becoming the fourth wife or, as she is referred to, the Fourth Mistress (Sì Tàitai) of the household. Arriving at the abode, she is at first treated like royalty, receiving foot massages and brightly lit red lanterns, as well as a visit from her husband, Master Chen (Ma Jingwu), the master of the house, whose face is never clearly shown.

Songlian soon discovers, however, that this luxurious treatment is not a given. The master decides on a daily basis which wife he will spend the night with; whomever he chooses gets her lanterns lit, receives the foot massage, gets her choice of menu items at mealtime, and gets the most attention and respect from the servants.

The First Mistress, Yuru (Jin Shuyuan), appears to be about as old as the master himself. Having borne a son decades earlier, she appears firm and rigid. The Second Mistress, Zhuoyun (Zhuóyún, Cao Cuifen), befriends Songlian, complimenting her youth and beauty, and giving her expensive silk as a gift; she also warns her about the Third Mistress, Meishan (Méishan, He Saifei), a former opera singer who is spoiled and seems unable to cope with no longer being the youngest and most favored. Meishan is aloof and cold towards Songlian.

Songlian also has to deal with her personal maid, Yan'er (Yàn'ér, played by Kong Lin), who resents her because Yan'er had hoped to become the fourth mistress herself. Songlian catches Yan'er fooling around with the Master in her bed.

Songlian later meets the grown son of First Mistress while he is playing the flute. She searches for her own flute, a memento from her deceased father, and finds that it has gone missing. While searching for the lost flute, she discovers that Yan'er has red lanterns concealed in her room, which is forbidden. She has also been concealing a curse charm with Songlian's name on it. Songlian promises not to tell anyone if the illiterate Yan'er reveals who had written Songlian's name for her, and Yan'er reveals it to be Zhuoyun.

Zhuoyun asks Songlian to give her a haircut, and in doing so, Songlian cuts her ear, pretending it was an accident. After hearing about this, Meishan reveals Zhuoyun tried to poison her when they were both pregnant with children. She advises Songlian to bear the master a son if she wants to maintain her place.

Songlian feigns pregnancy, attempting to garner the majority of the master's time and, in the meantime, attempting to become actually pregnant. Zhuoyun, however, is in league with Yan'er, who finds and tells her about a pair of Songlian's undergarments stained with period blood. Zhuoyun asks the master to summon the family physician, feigning concern for Songlian's "pregnancy." Doctor Gao (Gao-yisheng, Cui Zhigang) examines Songlian and determines the pregnancy to be a sham. Infuriated, the master orders Songlian's lanterns covered with thick black canvas bags indefinitely. Blaming the sequence of events on Yan'er, Songlian reveals to the house that Yan'er's room is filled with red lanterns, which is against the rules.

Yan'er is punished by having to kneel in the snow until she apologizes. She refuses to apologize, and thus remains kneeling in the snow throughout the night until she collapses. She falls sick and is taken to the hospital.

Songlian muses to Meishan that it would be better if she just hanged herself. Meishan says that she copes by amusing herself. Songlian comments that Meishan at least has her affair with Doctor Gao to keep her happy. Meishan warns Songlian that if she tells anyone she will have to deal with her, and that she was going to see Gao that night.

Songlian asks for alcohol and a dinner to celebrate her twentieth birthday by herself. The servant tells her that Yan'er has died and that she died saying her name. She drinks to intoxication and laments she is all alone. Zhouyun comes with a servant to try to stop her drunken behavior. Songlian accidentally lets slip Meishan's affair with Doctor Gao.

When Songlian awakes, she hears Meishan being dragged away by the servants. Zhuoyun thanks Songlian for letting her know. Zhuoyun's servant tells Songlian that Zhuoyun had found Meishan and the Doctor in bed in a hotel, and that it was Songlian who told Zhuoyun this while she was drunk.

Songlian sees Meishan dragged to a segregated room (referred to as the room of death earlier on because two women had been hanged there as punishment for committing adultery) on the roof of the estate. After the servants leave, Songlian goes into the room and becomes hysterical, calling everyone a murderer.

The Master demands to know what Songlian saw. A distraught Songlian says they are murderers. The Master tells her she did not see a thing.

Later, the servants discover all the lanterns to be lit in Meishan's room. A phonograph of her singing can be heard. The servants run out, saying the place is haunted by Meishan's ghosts. Songlian is seen as the one who staged this and sits by herself in the room.

The following summer, after the Master's marriage to yet another mistress, the new mistress is getting her foot massage and asks who the person in the courtyard is. The servant says that it was the fourth mistress and she has gone insane.

Songlian is shown wandering aimlessly in the compound in her old schoolgirl clothes.

== Cast ==
- Gong Li as Songlian (simplified Chinese: 颂莲; traditional Chinese: 頌蓮; pinyin: Sònglián) - Known as Lotus in the English version of the novel.
- He Saifei as Meishan (梅珊; Méishān), the third mistress (三太太; Sān tàitai) - Known as Coral in the English version of the novel.
- Cao Cuifen as Zhuoyun (卓云; 卓雲; Zhuóyún), the second mistress (二太太; Èr tàitai) - Known as Cloud in the English version of the novel.
- Kong Lin as Yan'er (雁儿; 雁兒; Yàn'ér), Songlian's young servant - Known as Swallow in the English version of the novel.
- Zhou Qi (Chinese: 周琦) as housekeeper Chen Baishun (陈百顺; 陳百順; Chén Bǎishùn)
- Jin Shuyuan (金淑媛) as Yuru (毓如; Yùrú), the first wife (大太太; dà tàitai) - Known as Joy in the English version of the novel.
- Ma Jingwu as Chen Zuoqian (陈佐千; 陳佐韆; Chén Zuǒqiān) or Master Chen
- Cui Zhihgang as Doctor Gao (高医生; 高醫生; Gāo-yīshēng)
- Chu Xiao (初曉; Chū Xiǎo) as Feipu (飞浦; 飛浦; Fēipǔ), the master's eldest son
- Cao Zhengyin as Songlian's old servant
- Ding Weimin as Songlian's mother

== Soundtrack ==
Raise the Red Lantern

Soundtrack album by Zhao Jiping
- Released: 1994
- Label: Milan Records

All songs composed by Zhao Jiping.

1. "Opening Credits/Prologue/Zhouyun/Lanterns"
2. "First Night With Master/Alone on First Night Second Night Third Night"
3. "Summer"
4. "Flute Solo"
5. "Record"
6. "Autumn"
7. "Births/The Peking Theme"
8. "Pregnancy/Yan'er's Punishment"
9. "Meishan Sings"
10. "Young Master Returns Meishan's Punishment"
11. "Realization"
12. "Winter"
13. "Ghost"
14. "Seasons"
15. "Next Summer"
16. "House of Death"
17. "Fifth Mistress"
18. "Songlian's Madness/End Credits"

== Distribution ==
Raise the Red Lantern has been distributed on VHS, Laserdisc and DVD by numerous different distributors, with many coming under criticism for their poor quality.

The Razor Digital Entertainment DVD release has been widely criticised. DVD Times states "Many other viewers will find this DVD release simply intolerable." DVDTown criticised the same release, giving the video quality 1 out of 10 and the audio quality 6 out of 10, summarising that "the video is a disaster". DVDFile adds to this stating "this horrible DVD is only recommended to those who love the movie so much, that they’ll put up with anything to own a Region 1 release." The translation on this version has been also widely criticised for its numerous inaccuracies. A release by Rajon Vision has also received poor commentary.

ERA's first release received similar attention but the second digitally remastered edition has been more warmly received with DVD Times stating that "It's a film that really needs a Criterion edition with a new print or a full restoration, but in the absence of any likelihood of that, this Era Hong Kong edition is about as good as you could hope for." DVDBeaver broadly agrees stating "Now, this is not Criterion image quality, but it is not bad at all. It is easily the best digital representation of this film currently available." DVD Talk, though, believes that "This new version is a stunner".

A new MGM release in 2007 has also received some positive feedback.

In March 2026, Film Movement announced that they had acquired the North American distribution rights for Raise the Red Lantern. After restoring the film in 4K resolution, they plan to give it a theatrical screening before releasing it on streaming platforms.

== Reception ==
=== Box office ===
Raise the Red Lantern has sold copyright to 35 countries worldwide. It was a big hit in Europe, with 43 copies touring in Italy, from big towns to small towns, grossing more than $3 million. France, with nine copies, grossing more than $2 million. It was released on March 13, 1992, and final grossing in the US market is $2,603,061. Outside Asia, Raise the Red Lantern earned of $11 million for production company HK ERA International

=== Critical response ===
Described as "one of the landmark films of the 1990s" by Jonathan Crow of AllMovie, where it received five out of five, Raise the Red Lantern was critically acclaimed. James Berardinelli named it his 7th best film of the 1990s. It has a 98% rating at review aggregator website Rotten Tomatoes, based on 41 reviews, with an average rating of 9.1/10. The website's critical consensus states: "Visually thrilling and rich with emotion, Raise the Red Lantern offers an engrossing period drama anchored by an outstanding performance from Gong Li". TV Guide gave it five out of five. However, there were a small number of negative reviews: Hal Hinson of The Washington Post, for example, stated that "the story never amounts to much more than a rather tepid Chinese rendition of "The Women." The film ranked #28 in Empire magazines "The 100 Best Films Of World Cinema" in 2010.

The film was also praised for its artistic merit. Desson Howe of The Washington Post stated that "In purely aesthetic terms, Raise the Red Lantern is breathtaking" and James Berardinelli stated that "the appeal to the eye only heightens the movie's emotional power". John Hartl of Film.com described it as "a near-perfect movie that often recalls the visual purity and intensity of silent films". Roger Ebert of the Chicago Sun Times gave the film four out of four stars, praising its screenplay, actors, and visuals, and concluded "There is a sense in which Raise the Red Lantern exists solely for the eyes. Entirely apart from the plot, there is the sensuous pleasure of the architecture, the fabrics, the color contrasts, the faces of the actresses. But beneath the beauty is the cruel reality of this life, just as beneath the comfort of the rich man's house is the sin of slavery." He later placed the film on his "Great Movies" list.

The film's popularity has also been attributed to a resurgence in Chinese tourism after the government response to the Tiananmen Square Protests of 1989, due to its use of exotic locations.

Raise the Red Lantern appeared on over 36 Top Ten lists for 1992, making it one of the films with the most appearances on those lists.

=== Accolades and nominations ===
Awards	Year	Category	Recipient	Result
Venice International Film Festival	1991	Silver Lion	Zhang Yimou	Won
Venice International Film Festival	1991	Golden Lion	Raise the Red Lantern	Nominated
Academy Awards	1992	Best Foreign Language Film	Hong Kong	Nominated
Boston Society of Film Critics	1992	Best Foreign Language Film	Raise the Red Lantern	Won
David di Donatello Awards	1992	Best Foreign Film	Raise the Red Lantern	Won
David di Donatello Awards	1992	Best Foreign Actress	Gong Li	Nominated
Guldbagge Awards	1992	Best Foreign Film	Raise the Red Lantern	Nominated
Independent Spirit Awards	1992	Best International Film	Raise the Red Lantern	Nominated
Kansas City Film Critics Circle	1992	Best Foreign Language Film	Raise the Red Lantern	Won
London Film Critics' Circle	1992	Foreign Language Film of the Year	Raise the Red Lantern	Won
Los Angeles Film Critics Association Awards	1992	Best Cinematography	Zhao Fei	Won
Los Angeles Film Critics Association Awards	1992	Best Foreign Language Film	Raise the Red Lantern	Runner-up
National Board of Review	1992	Best Foreign Language Film	Raise the Red Lantern	Top 5
National Society of Film Critics Awards	1992	Best Foreign Language Film	Raise the Red Lantern	Won
National Society of Film Critics Awards	1992	Best Cinematography	Zhao Fei	Won
New York Film Critics Circle Awards	1992	Best Foreign Language Film	Raise the Red Lantern	Won
New York Film Critics Circle Awards	1992	Best Cinematography	Zhao Fei	Runner-up
Australian Film Institute Awards	1993	Best Foreign Film	Raise the Red Lantern	Nominated
Belgian Film Critics Association	1993	Grand Prix	Raise the Red Lantern	Won
British Academy Film Awards	1993	Best Film Not in the English Language	Raise the Red Lantern	Won
Hundred Flowers Awards	1993	Best Picture	Raise the Red Lantern	Won
Hundred Flowers Awards	1993	Best Actress	Gong Li	Won

=== Recognition ===
- Empire 100 Best Films of World Cinema – #28
- Time Out 100 Best Chinese Mainland Films – #13
- Included in The New York Times's list of The Best 1000 Movies Ever Made in 2004
- Included in BBC's 2018 list of The 100 greatest foreign language films voted by 209 film critics from 43 countries around the world.

== See also ==
- List of submissions to the 64th Academy Awards for Best Foreign Language Film
- List of Hong Kong submissions for the Academy Award for Best Foreign Language Film
