= Rob Young (sound engineer) =

Sound engineer (died 2023)

- Born: c. 1946; Sussex, New Brunswick, Canada
- Died: June 11, 2023 (aged 76); Albi, France
- Education: Ryerson University
- Occupation: Sound engineer
- Years active: 1975–2010
- Spouse: Yvonne Wetherall
- Children: 3

Rob Young (c. 1946 – June 11, 2023) was a Canadian sound engineer. He was nominated for an Academy Award in the category Best Sound for the film Unforgiven. He worked on more than 100 films since 1975.

Young studied at a technical school in Saint John before attending Ryerson University in Toronto, Ontario to study radio and television arts.

Young died in Albi, France on June 11, 2023, from complications of a fall that happened during a trip to Morocco. He was 76.

== Selected filmography ==
- Unforgiven (1992)
- Jumanji (1995)
- Romeo + Juliet (1996)
- X2 (2003)
