= Janice Blackie-Goodine =

Canadian set decorator

- Occupation: Set decorator
- Years active: 1987-present

Janice Blackie-Goodine is a set decorator. She was nominated for an Academy Award in the category Best Art Direction for the film Unforgiven, and was co-winner with Carol Spier of the Genie Award for Best Art Direction/Production Design for the film Passchendaele at the 29th Genie Awards.

== Selected filmography ==
- Unforgiven (1992)
- The Assassination of Jesse James by the Coward Robert Ford (2007)
- Passchendaele (2008)
