= 1992 New York Film Critics Circle Awards =

58th New York Film Critics Circle Awards

January 17, 1993

Best Picture:
The Player

The 58th New York Film Critics Circle Awards honored the best filmmaking of 1992. The winners were announced on 17 December 1992 and the awards were given on 17 January 1993.

== Winners ==
- Best Actor:
  - Denzel Washington - Malcolm X
  - Runners-up: Harvey Keitel - Bad Lieutenant and Al Pacino - Scent of a Woman
- Best Actress:
  - Emma Thompson - Howards End
  - Runners-up: Susan Sarandon - Lorenzo's Oil and Michelle Pfeiffer - Love Field
- Best Cinematography:
  - Jean Lépine - The Player
  - Runners-up: Jean de Segonzac - Laws of Gravity and Zhao Fei - Raise the Red Lantern (Da hong deng long gao gao gua)
- Best Director:
  - Robert Altman - The Player
  - Runners-up: Clint Eastwood - Unforgiven and James Ivory - Howards End
- Best Documentary:
  - Brother's Keeper
  - Runners-up: American Dream and A Brief History of Time
- Best Film:
  - The Player
  - Runners-up: Unforgiven and Howards End
- Best Foreign Language Film:
  - Raise the Red Lantern (Da hong deng long gao gao gua) • China/Hong Kong/Taiwan
  - Runners-up: The Match Factory Girl (Tulitikkutehtaan tyttö) • Finland/Sweden and Indochine • France
- Best New Director:
  - Allison Anders - Gas Food Lodging
  - Runners-up: Quentin Tarantino - Reservoir Dogs and Tim Robbins - Bob Roberts
- Best Screenplay:
  - Neil Jordan - The Crying Game
  - Runners-up: Michael Tolkin - The Player and David Webb Peoples - Unforgiven
- Best Supporting Actor:
  - Gene Hackman - Unforgiven
  - Runners-up: Seymour Cassel - In the Soup and Jack Nicholson - A Few Good Men
- Best Supporting Actress:
  - Miranda Richardson - The Crying Game, Enchanted April and Damage
  - Runners-up: Judy Davis - Husbands and Wives and Alfre Woodard - Passion Fish
