= Geraldine Peroni =

American film editor

- Geraldine Peroni and Robert Altman
- Born: July 5, 1953; New York, New York
- Died: August 3, 2004 (aged 51); New York, New York
- Occupation: film editor

Geraldine "Geri" Peroni (July 5, 1953 – August 3, 2004) was an American film editor who was best known for working with Robert Altman. She received a nomination for the Academy Award for Best Film Editing for her work on Altman's 1992 film, The Player.

== Life and career ==
Peroni was born in Manhattan, New York City and grew up in the borough of Queens. Her collaboration with Altman extended over eight films. Altman said of Peroni "I trusted her totally with everything, I was planning on using her in the next film. She and I saw very much the same way — we just read each other so well."

She was nominated for an Academy Award for Best Film Editing, the BAFTA Award for Best Editing, and the American Cinema Editors Eddie for her work on The Player (1992). In his obituary, Tony Sloman discussed this film's editing:

The Player is a marvellous example of collaborative editing, Peroni matching Altman's tone with exactitude. Early on, a cut from a zoom-in to the gun in Humphrey Bogart's hand on a postcard sent to Tim Robbins is perfectly successively matched with what appears to be a black frame, in which a reveal shows that it's an open drawer in which the postcard has been placed. Another felicitous sequence is the one in the Pasadena police station, where the Robbins character is arraigned as Lyle Lovett swats a fly and Whoopi Goldberg and her associates ridicule Robbins with laughter. This is beautifully edited; well-shot, too, but the rhythm is built in the cutting.

Peroni's work on Short Cuts (1993) has been discussed by Krin Gabbard, who wrote, "Altman has invited his audiences to provide connections among scenes that float loosely about each other at the same time that he has benefited from the intelligent choices made by the film's editor Geraldine Peroni."

Peroni was found dead at her home in 2004. Her death was ruled a suicide by the New York coroner, a fact reportedly disputed by her family. She was in the midst of editing Brokeback Mountain. Dylan Tichenor completed Peroni's work; he later said, "I learned to edit from her, when she was Robert Altman's editor and I was her apprentice on The Player, and I worked with her for five years. While she was cutting Brokeback Mountain, she died rather suddenly, tragically. The first month was really difficult, seeing the work she'd done, all her selections and knowing her thinking behind it. Soon, it got to be cathartic and good to spend this time with her- I found myself thinking about her all the time through this process and it was a gift to me in that way." Tichenor and Peroni were nominated for numerous editing awards for Brokeback Mountain, including the BAFTA Award and the American Cinema Editors Eddie.

The Wire episode "Back Burners" was dedicated to her memory. The credits of Brokeback Mountain also read "In Loving Memory of Geraldine Peroni".

== Filmography ==
The director(s) of each film are listed in parentheses.

- 1990: Iron & Silk (Shirley Sun).
- 1990: Vincent & Theo (Altman; with Françoise Coispeau). Peroni's first film with Altman as editor. Altman was working in France and wanted an additional, English speaking editor. He had met Peroni when she was an assistant on O.C. and Stiggs.
- 1991: Johnny Suede (Tom DiCillo). This was the first film that DiCillo directed.
- 1992: The Player (Altman). Peroni was nominated for an Academy Award for her second film with Altman, this time as the sole editor.
- 1992: Thank God I'm a Lesbian (Dominique Cardona and Laurie Colbert)
- 1993: Short Cuts (Altman)
- 1993: Prêt-à-Porter (Altman)
- 1994: Thick Lips Thin Lips (Paul Lee)
- 1996: Kansas City (Altman)
- 1996: Michael (Nora Ephron)
- 1998: The Gingerbread Man (Altman)
- 1999: Cradle Will Rock (Tim Robbins). Robbins is also an actor who played parts in Altman's films The Player, Short Cuts, and Prêt-à-Porter.
- 1999: Jesus' Son (Alison Maclean)
- 2000: The Girl (Sande Zeig)
- 2000: Dr. T and the Women (Altman)
- 2001: The Safety of Objects (Rose Troche)
- 2002–2003: The Wire (TV)
- 2003: The Company (Altman)
- 2005: Brokeback Mountain (Ang Lee). Peroni died while editing, which was completed by Dylan Tichenor. The two editors were nominated for the BAFTA Award for Best Editing and for an American Cinema Editors Eddie Award.

== See also ==
- List of film director and editor collaborations
