= Chicago Film Critics Association Awards 1992 =

Annual US film awards ceremony

5th CFCA Awards

Best Film:
Malcolm X

The 5th Chicago Film Critics Association Awards honored the finest achievements in 1992 filmmaking.

== Winners ==
- Best Picture – Malcolm X
- Best Foreign Film – The Crying Game
- Best Director – Spike Lee – Malcolm X
- Best Screenplay – Michael Tolkin – The Player
- Best Actor – Denzel Washington – Malcolm X
- Best Actress – Emma Thompson – Howards End
- Best Supporting Actor – Jack Nicholson – A Few Good Men
- Best Supporting Actress – Judy Davis – Husbands and Wives
- Best Cinematography – Michael Ballhaus – Bram Stoker's Dracula
- Most Promising Actor – Chris O'Donnell – Scent of a Woman
- Most Promising Actress – Marisa Tomei – My Cousin Vinny / Chaplin
- Commitment to Chicago Award – Joyce Sloan
