= List of films featuring the Irish Republican Army =

This is a list of films in which the Irish Republican Army, a faction thereof or a break away organisation (whether real or fictional) is portrayed either through its plot or by a main character.

Title	Director	Notable cast	Summary	Released	Notes
Juno and the Paycock	Alfred Hitchcock	Maire O'Neill, Edward Chapman, Sidney Morgan, Sara Allgood	A long suffering wife's dismay as her troubled family is unwound by the prospect of wealth. Her husband is useless, her son is pursued by rebels for informing, and her daughter is dangerously in love with a lawyer due an inheritance. She tries to save her family from the storms that follows. Based on the 1924 play by Seán O'Casey.	1930	
The Informer	John Ford	Victor McLaglen	A disgraced former IRA member decides to inform on his former comrade and use the bounty to emigrate. His former comrade is then killed in a gunfight and things spiral as it becomes known it was he who informed. Based on the novel by Liam O'Flaherty.	1935	
Beloved Enemy	H.C. Potter	Merle Oberon, Brian Aherne, David Niven	During the Irish War of Independence an Irish rebel leader and a British aristocratic woman fall in love. The rebel however is pursued by a British Army officer.	1936	
My Life for Ireland	Max W. Kimmich	Anna Dammann, René Deltgen	A Nazi propaganda film where a young student who sells out his love interest to the Secret Service after seeing her with a wanted Irish revolutionary, must risk his life to rehabilitate himself.	1941	
I See a Dark Stranger	Frank Launder	Deborah Kerr, Trevor Howard	A young Irish woman becomes a Nazi spy.	1946	
Odd Man Out	Carol Reed	James Mason	A wounded Irish nationalist leader in Belfast attempts to evade police following a failed robbery. (The group he belongs to is not named, but the IRA were the only Irish republican group active at the time.)	1947	
The Quiet Man	John Ford	John Wayne	A retired boxer returns home to Ireland. He falls for a fiery red-head, whose brother forms a rivalry with him.	1952	
The Gentle Gunman	Basil Dearden	John Mills, Dirk Bogarde	IRA Volunteer Terry Sullivan (Mills) become disillusioned with a bombing campaign of London during the Second World War.	1952	
Shake Hands with the Devil	Michael Anderson	James Cagney, Don Murray, Dana Wynter, Glynis Johns	A young American gets involved in the 1921 battles between the Black and Tans and the IRA, - but at last he becomes sick of all the killing and puts an end to it by shooting an IRA-leader.	1959	
A Terrible Beauty (also known as The Night Fighters)	Tay Garnett	Robert Mitchum	The Night Fighters is a look at the conflicted loyalties that trouble a daring young IRA recruit who comes to realize that some of his IRA cohorts are seriously misguided, and that the Nazis aren't to be trusted as allies. Based on the 1958 A Terrible Beauty novel by Arthur Roth.	1960	
The Day They Robbed the Bank of England	Aldo Ray	Peter O Toole	In London in 1901, during Ireland's struggle for independence, Charles Norgate, an Irish American, is recruited by Irish revolutionaries to rob the Bank of England. Iris Muldoon, widow of an Irish independence martyr, enlists Norgate for the heist. Led by O'Shea, the group plans to steal one million pounds in gold bullion as a political statement.	1960	
Ryan's Daughter	David Lean	Sarah Miles, Robert Mitchum, John Mills, Leo McKern, Trevor Howard	IRA men arrive in a village to prepare to receive a delivery of German rifles from a ship offshore. Although the villagers help them recover the weapons during a storm, they are captured by the local British Army detachment on leaving the beach.	1970	
Duck, You Sucker!	Sergio Leone	James Coburn, Rod Steiger	An Irish explosives expert on the run and a Mexican bandit unintentionally get involved in the Mexican Revolution.	1971	
A Sense of Loss	Marcel Ophüls		Documentary shot over six weeks in December 1971, and January 1972, the film consisted of interviews with Protestants, Catholics, politicians, and some soldiers, combined with TV news clips of bombings and violence.	1972	
NO GO!	Richard Chase		Docudrama about both the Provisional IRA and Official IRA in Derry's Bogside.	1973	
Hennessy	Don Sharp	Rod Steiger, Lee Remick	After his family is killed, a once peaceful Irishman plots revenge, setting out to destroy the British Parliament.	1975	
The Eagle Has Landed	John Sturges	Michael Caine, Donald Sutherland, Robert Duvall	A former IRA man sheltering in Nazi Germany, where he works as a lecturer, is parachuted into England to make preparations for a Luftwaffe parachute unit, disguised as Polish soldiers, tasked with capturing or killing Prime Minister Sir Winston Churchill.	1976	
The Patriot Game	Arthur MacCaig		A history of the Northern Irish conflict from 1968 to 1978, including the origins of the IRA and the conflict itself.	1979	documentary
The Outsider	Tony Luraschi	Craig Wasson, Sterling Hayden, Patricia Quinn, Niall O'Brien	An Irish-American man travels to Ireland during the 1970s and joins the IRA. Based on the book The Heritage of Michael Flaherty by Colin Leinster.	1979	
The Long Good Friday	John Mackenzie	Bob Hoskins, Helen Mirren	A London crime boss is beset by problems which prove to be caused by the Provisional IRA, targeting his organisation following coincidental events that incorrectly implicate his involvement.	1980	
Guests of the Nation	John J. Desmond		Two British enlistees being held captive by the IRA during the Irish War of Independence form a sense of camaraderie with their IRA guards. Difficulties ensure when they are to be executed. Based on a short story by Frank O'Connor.	1981	Television film
Harry's Game	Lawrence Gordon Clark	Ray Lonnen, Derek Thompson	An IRA rifleman who assassinated a British minister in front of his family in London is tracked down by an undercover British Army officer. Based on Gerald Seymour’s 1975 novel.	1982	Television serial
Giro City (also known by And Nothing But the Truth)	Karl Francis	Glenda Jackson, Jon Finch, Kenneth Colley, Bruce Alexander, Sharon Morgan	Drama about a TV current affairs team who are working on two major news stories, and find themselves coming up against censorship and self-censorship in the media.	1982	Television film
Cal	Pat O'Connor	Helen Mirren, John Lynch, Donal McCann, Ray McAnally, John Kavanagh, Tom Hickey, J. J. Murphy	A young Provisional IRA member wants to leave after falling in love with the widow of a victim. Based on a novella by Bernard MacLaverty.	1984	
The Glory Boys	Michael Ferguson	Anthony Perkins, Rod Steiger, Alfred Burke, Joanna Lumley	The IRA assigns one of its members to aid a PLO assassin in his attempt to kill an Israeli nuclear scientist in London, while British Intelligence officers attempt to prevent and capture them.	1984	Television serial
Contact	Alan Clarke	Sean Chapman	A platoon of British paratroopers on border patrol in South Armagh face a series of tense encounters. Based on A.F.N. Clarke's experiences as a Parachute Regiment officer in 1970s Northern Ireland.	1984	Television film
In This Corner	Atom Egoyan		An amateur boxer from Canada becomes an unwitting pawn in The Troubles when he is convinced by Irish Republican Army to help smuggle accused member back into Ireland as part of his entourage.	1986	Television film
A Prayer for the Dying	Mike Hodges	Mickey Rourke, Bob Hoskins, Alan Bates, Liam Neeson, Leonard Termo, Camille Coduri, Alison Doody	A former IRA member escapes to London and tries to forget his past.	1987	
Naming the Names	Sylvestra Le Touzel	Stuart Burge	Young Belfast woman committed to republican cause caught in web of conflicting loyalties and violence. Based on a short fiction story by Anne Devlin.	1987	TV movie
Act of Betrayal	Lawrence Gordon Clark	Elliott Gould, Patrick Bergin	An IRA informer and his family are given new identities and new lives in Australia but the IRA are still determined to track them down.	1988	TV movie
The Dawning	Robert Knights	Anthony Hopkins, Hugh Grant, Jean Simmons, Trevor Howard, Rebecca Pidgeon	Depiction of the Irish War of Independence through the eyes of the Anglo-Irish landlord class.	1988	
The Grasscutter	Ian Mune	Terence Cooper, Ian McElhinney	An Ulster Volunteer Force informer living under an assumed identity in New Zealand is revealed, with both loyalist and republican groups eager to track him down.	1988	
A Casualty of War	Tom Clegg		Following an American air strike on Libyan leader Colonel Gaddafi's personal residence, the Libyan leader agrees to supply the IRA with weapons in revenge for Britain's involvement. Aware of the plans, MI5 persuade a former SAS man to go undercover and investigate the shipment. It is a dangerous mission especially with all becoming increasingly suspicious of him, who having retired, has become a well-known writer.	1989	Television film
Elephant	Alan Clarke		A chilling commentary on the sectarian murders which are everyday events there, covering several sectarian murders that happened during the troubles.	1989	Television film
Who Bombed Birmingham?	Mike Beckham	John Hurt, Martin Shaw	Docudrama about the Birmingham Pub Bombings and the subsequent Birmingham Six.	1991	Documentary film
Behind the Mask	Frank Martin		A documentary on the life and attitudes of IRA members. Includes interviews with Brendan Hughes, Martin Meehan, Joe Cahill, Gerry Adams, and Martin McGuinness, as well as some others.	1991	Documentary film
The Treaty	Jonathan Lewis	Brendan Gleeson, Bosco Hogan, Ian Bannen, Julian Fellowes, Barry McGovern	Depiction of the negotiations for the 1921 Anglo-Irish Treaty towards the end of the Irish War of Independence, and the aftermath of the treaty leading to the Irish Civil War.	1991	Television film
Force of Duty	Pat O'Connor	Adrian Dunbar, Donal McCann, Patrick Malahide	An RUC detective is consumed by guilt after he fails to act decisively in a moment of terror. As the pressure on him builds, he gradually loses control of his life.	1992	Television film
Patriot Games	Phillip Noyce	Harrison Ford	A former CIA analyst witnesses and intervenes in an attempted kidnapping of the British Minister of State for Northern Ireland by a radical IRA splinter group. The group then aims to take revenge on him, while he aims to stop them. Adaptation of the 1987 novel by Tom Clancy.	1992	
The Crying Game	Neil Jordan	Stephen Rea, Miranda Richardson, Forest Whitaker, Jaye Davidson, Adrian Dunbar, Tony Slattery, Jim Broadbent, Ralph Brown, Andrée Bernard	The Provisional IRA unit kidnap a black British soldier after a female member of their unit lures him to a secluded area by promising sex. The unit intends to use him to secure the release of an imprisoned Provisional IRA member. He is executed when the deadline expires. Years later a member of the unit befriends his partner in London.	1992	
Circles of Deceit	Geoffrey Sax		The British Secret Service enlists the help of a former Special Air Service soldier to go undercover and infiltrate the IRA.	1993	Television film
In the Name of the Father	Jim Sheridan	Daniel Day-Lewis Pete Postlethwaite	Based on the Guildford Four, father and son are falsely imprisoned as IRA members accused of committing the Guildford pub bombing.	1993	
Blown Away	Stephen Hopkins	Jeff Bridges, Tommy Lee Jones	A former IRA bomber escapes from prison and begins a campaign targeting members of the Boston police's bomb squad.	1994	
Patriots	Frank Kerr		An Irish-American girl in Boston, whose grandfather fought the Black and Tans, is persuaded to travel to Ireland to help the IRA. Unbeknownst to her, her recruiter is a double agent for the British Army.	1994	
More Than a Sacrifice	Tom Collins		A look at how four republicans adjusted to a post-ceasefire way of life after the 1994 IRA ceasefire.	1995	Documentary film
The Boys of Barr na Sráide	Conor O'Carroll			1996	Short film
Michael Collins	Neil Jordan	Liam Neeson, Aidan Quinn, Stephen Rea, Alan Rickman, Julia Roberts, Brendan Gleeson	Biopic about Irish revolutionary Michael Collins.	1996	
Some Mother's Son	Terry George	Helen Mirren, Fionnula Flanagan	Two mothers are faced with a dilemma when their sons in the IRA take part in the 1981 Hunger Strike.	1996	
The Eliminator	Enda Hughes		Set in the middle of the Troubles, it tells the story of a gang of youths in County Armagh known as 'The Organisation' fighting the British secret service for control of a super-vehicle named The Viper, whose plans are in the hands of a republican rebel.	1996	
The Devil's Own	Alan J. Pakula	Brad Pitt, Harrison Ford	An NYPD officer discovers that an Irish immigrant they housed is an undercover member of the IRA attempting to purchase missiles.	1997	
Midnight Man	Lawrence Gordon Clark		British soldiers force a recently captured IRA member to cooperate with them and to go undercover to prevent an attempt on the life of the U.S. president. But the spy soon realizes that the first plot is but a ruse for a more sinister scheme risking trouble between China and the United Kingdom.	1997	Television film
A Further Gesture (Also known as The Break)	Robert Dornhelm	Stephen Rea, Alfred Molina, Rosana Pastor, Brendan Gleeson, Jorge Sanz	Following his escape from prison, an IRA member escapes to America. Jaded, he is determined not to take up any fresh causes in America. He then falls in with some Guatemalan exiles who aim to assassinate a member of the CIA. He reluctantly helps the amateur trio so that he and one of the Guatemalans he has fallen for can escape together. This “further gesture” is to have unexpected repercussions for all four.	1997	
The Informant	Jim McBride		A man who escaped the troubles is reluctantly pulled out of retirement in the Republic of Ireland by the IRAwho bring him back to Belfast to perform one last job due to his skill with an RPG. Initially refusing the job, he realises he has no choice. He is to kill a judge using an RPG. During the getaway he is arrested and becomes a supergrass.	1997	
The Jackal	Michael Caton-Jones	Bruce Willis, Richard Gere	An ex-IRA gunman is recruited to assist the CIA in tracking down a suspected presidential assassin.	1997	
The Boxer	Jim Sheridan	Daniel Day-Lewis, Emily Watson	A boxer, and former Provisional IRA returns home from a 14-year stint in prison at the age of 32. Weary of the unbroken cycle of violence in Northern Ireland, he attempts to settle down and live in peace. He starts up a non-sectarian boxing club for boys in an old gymnasium.	1997	
The General	John Boorman	Brendan Gleeson	Details the life of Dublin underworld figure Martin Cahill.	1998	
Titanic Town	Roger Michell		A mother and her family move during the height of the troubles into a housing estate in Catholic West Belfast. Violent conflict exists side-by-side with normal civilian life. But when an old friend is killed in the crossfire, it leads the mother to a meeting of a women's peace group. Based on the 1993 autobiography by Mary Costello.	1998	
Divorcing Jack	David Caffrey	David Thewlis, Rachel Griffiths, Jason Isaacs, Richard Gant, Robert Lindsay	A Northern Irish reporter gets entangled in a web of political intrigue and sectarian violence, at the same time as Northern Ireland is set to elect a new Prime Minister. Adaptation of the 1995 book by Colin Bateman.	1998	
Ronin	John Frankenheimer	Robert De Niro	IRA operatives hire mercenaries to retrieve a mysterious briefcase.	1998	
The Craic	Ted Emery		Two best friends flee from Belfast and illegally enter Australia after a violent confrontation with the IRA.	1999	
Exiled	Bill Muir		An Irishman emigrates to New York to escape the tensions of Northern Ireland in 1991. However, this does not free him from strife, soon finding himself in the middle of a gun-running operation involving his cousin and two hot-headed friends.	1999	
Brits	Peter Taylor		Depiction of the covert war in Northern Ireland including interviews of former members of 14 Intelligence Company, the RUC Headquarters Mobile Support Unit and MI6.	2000	Documentary television series
Borstal Boy	Peter Sheridan	Shawn Hatosy, Danny Dyer, Michael York, Eva Birthistle, Ian McElhinney, Ronnie Drew	A young Behan, is jailed during an IRA bombing mission in Liverpool. He loses his naïveté over the three years of his sentence to a juvenile borstal, softening his radical Irish republican stance and warming to his British fellow prisoners. Based on the 1958 autobiography by Brendan Behan.	2000	
An Everlasting Piece	Barry Levinson	Barry McEvoy, Brían F. O'Byrne, Anna Friel, Pauline McLynn, Laurence Kinlan, Billy Connolly, Enda Oates	Two wig salesmen, one Catholic and one Protestant, live in war-torn Belfast, Northern Ireland in the mid-1980s and embark on their plan to get rich through selling hair pieces. Their business ends up involved with the troubles.	2000	
The Bombmaker	Graham Theakston	Dervla Kirwan, Mark Womack, David Hunt, Francis Magee, Samantha Bond, Angeline Ball, Keith Duffy, Scott Maslen	A former IRA bombmaker is forced to come out of retirement when her daughter is kidnapped and held to ransom. Based on the novel by Stephen Leather.	2001	Television film
Shamrock and Swastika	Brendan Culleton, Irina Maldea		Examination of the Irish Republican Army's collaboration with the Abwehr during World War II.	2001	Television documentary
H3	Les Blair	Dean Lennox Kelly, Mark O'Halloran,	Depiction of the 1981 Irish hunger strike.	2001	
Bloody Sunday	Paul Greengrass	James Nesbit, Tim Pigott-Smith, Nicholas Farrell, Gerard McSorley	Depiction of the 1972 Bloody Sunday massacre.	2002	Television film
Sunday	Charles McDougall	Ciarán McMenamin, Christopher Eccleston	Depiction of the 1972 Bloody Sunday massacre.	2002	Television film
The Rising of the Moon	Deborah Baxtrom		IRA member Bobby Sands is visited by his mother while imprisoned in Northern Ireland.	2002	
Boxed	Marion Comer	Tom Murphy	A priest is called upon to provide last rites to an IRA prisoner.	2002	Drama
The Maze			A history of the notorious HMP Maze and its role in the troubles.	2002	Television documentary
Omagh	Pete Travis		Depiction of the 1998 Omagh Bombing by the Real IRA.	2004	Television film
Breakfast on Pluto	Neil Jordan	Cillian Murphy, Liam Neeson, Stephen Rea	A transgender woman foundling searching for love and her long-lost mother in small town Ireland and London in the 1970s.	2005	
The Year London Blew Up	Edmund Coulthard		Dramadoc about the 1974-75 Provisional IRA campaign in London, which culminated in the Balcombe Street siege.	2005	Television film
Johnny Was	Mark Hammond	Patrick Bergin, Samantha Mumba, Lennox Lewis, Roger Daltrey, Eriq La Salle	A Provisional IRA volunteer from Ireland escapes his violent past to lie low in London. This changes when his former mentor breaks out of Brixton Prison with members of a dissident republican group hellbent on derailing the Irish peace process.	2006	
The Wind That Shakes the Barley	Ken Loach	Cillian Murphy, Liam Cunningham, Pádraic Delaney, Orla Fitzgerald	Two brothers join the IRA in the Irish War of Independence after seeing a friend killed by the Black and Tans. However tensions rise when they are on opposing sides in the Irish Civil War that follows.	2006	
I.R.A. King of Nothing	Damian Chapa		A disgruntled IRA member becomes Ireland's biggest threat to the peace process.	2006	
Fifty Dead Men Walking	Kari Skogland	Ben Kingsley, Rose McGowan, Jim Sturgess	A loose adaptation of Martin McGartland's 1997 autobiography of the same name.	2008	
Hunger	Steve McQueen	Michael Fassbender, Liam Cunningham	Depiction of the Bobby Sands during the 1981 Irish hunger strike.	2008	
Five Minutes of Heaven	Oliver Hirschbiegel	Liam Neeson, James Nesbitt	Depiction of a historical killing in 1975 during the troubles, and a reconciliation attempt after 33 years.	2009	
Voices From The Grave	Kate O'Callaghan		The story of the Northern Ireland Troubles through the Provisional IRA's Brendan Hughes and the UVF's David Ervine, two men who played key roles on opposite sides of the ongoing conflict. Based on the book Voices from the Grave: Two Men's War in Ireland by Ed Maloney.	2010	Documentary
Shadow Dancer	James Marsh	Andrea Riseborough, Clive Owen, Gillian Anderson, Domhnall Gleeson	Following a failed bombing an IRA member is turned into an informer for MI5 to avoid imprisonment and protect her son. Based on the 1998 novel by Tom Bradby.	2012	
'71	Yann Demange	Jack O'Connell	A young British soldier is accidentally abandoned, following a riot in Belfast, in 1971.	2014	
The Journey	Nick Hamm	Timothy Spall, Colm Meaney, Freddie Highmore	A fictional account of the true story of how political enemies Ian Paisley and Martin McGuinness formed an unlikely political alliance.	2016	
Rebellion	Aku Louhimies	Charlie Murphy, Ruth Bradley, Sarah Greene, Brian Gleeson, Niamh Cusack, Michelle Fairley, Ian McElhinney, Barry Ward, Laurence O'Fuarain, Perdita Weeks	A five part serial drama about the birth of modern Ireland. The story is told from the perspectives of a group of fictional characters who live through the political events of the 1916 Easter Rising.	2016	
The Foreigner	Martin Campbell	Jackie Chan, Pierce Brosnan	A man seeks revenge for the death of his daughter, killed by a bombing committed by a rogue faction of the IRA.	2017	
Maze	Stephen Burke	Tom Vaughan-Lawlor	Prison film about the IRA Maze prison escape of 38 Provisional Irish Republican Army prisoners.	2017	
Resistance	Colin Teevan	Brian Gleeson, Simone Kirby, Natasha O'Keeffe, Gavin Drea	Set in late 1920, Resistance is a sequel series to the 2016 miniseries Rebellion.	2019	
Spotlight on the Troubles: A Secret History	Peter Johnston		A special from Spotlight delving into the role of British Intelligence's "dirty war" and collusion during the troubles.	2019	documentary
Baltimore	Christine Molloy Joe Lawlor	Imogen Poots	Biopic of heiress-turned-IRA member Rose Dugdale.	2023	
Dead Shot	Tom Guard & Charles Guard	Aml Ameen, Colin Morgan, Tom Vaughan-Lawlor, Sophia Brown, Máiréad Tyers, Mark Strong and Felicity Jones.	A retired Irish paramilitary witnesses the shooting of his pregnant wife by a British soldier and escapes, wounded and presumed dead, to 1970s London to plot his revenge.	2023	
The Secret Army	Darragh MacIntyre & Chris Thornton		Documentary by Darragh MacIntyre & Chris Thornton investigating the lost 1972 film 'The Secret Army' by John Bowyer Bell and Zwy Aldouby. It showed segments from the lost film, including some unseen footage of Provisional IRA operations and training. It also included interviews with Des Long, Tony Devine, Jacob Stern, and Tim Pat Coogan.	2024	Television documentary
