= List of books about the Troubles =

The following is a list of books about the Troubles in Northern Ireland.

== Non-fiction ==
- Baldy, F. Tom (1997). The Battle for Ulster: A Study of Internal Security. Diane Publishing ISBN 0-7881-4145-7
- Bell, J. Bowyer (1993). The Irish Troubles: A Generation of Violence 1967–1992. St. Martin's Press. ISBN 0-312-08827-2
- Beresford, David (1989). Ten Men Dead: The Story of the 1981 Irish Hunger Strike Atlantic Monthly Press ISBN 978-0-87113-269-7
- Bishop, Patrick; Mallie, Eamonn (1988). The Provisional IRA. London: Corgi. ISBN 978-0-552-13337-1.
- Bourke, Richard (2003). Peace in Ireland: The War of Ideas. London: Pimlico. ISBN 1844133168.
- Campbell, Julieann (2022). On Bloody Sunday: A new history of the day and its aftermath by those who were there Monoray Publishing ISBN 978-1-80096-043-5
- Carroll, Rory (2023). Killing Thatcher: The IRA, the Manhunt and the Long War on the Crown. London: HarperCollins GB. ISBN 978-0593419496. (Published in the United States under the title There Will Be Fire: Margaret Thatcher, the IRA, and Two Minutes That Changed History)
- Cobain, Ian (2020). Anatomy of a Killing: Life and Death on a Divided Island. London: Granta. ISBN 978-1846276408.
- Coogan, Tim Pat (2002). The IRA (5th ed.). New York: Palgrave Macmillan. ISBN 978-0312294168.
- Collins, Eamon and Mick McGovern (1999). Killing Rage. London: Granta. ISBN 978-1862070479
- Curtis, Liz (1984). Ireland: The Propaganda War – The British Media and the 'Battle for Hearts and Minds'. London: Pluto Press. ISBN 0861047575.
- Edwards, Aaron (2017). UVF: Behind the Mask. Newbridge, County Kildare: Merrion Press. ISBN 978-1785370878.
- Dillon, Martin (1989). The Shankill Butchers: A Case History of Mass Murder. London: Hutcheson
- Edwards, Ruth (2000). The Faithful Tribe: An Intimate Portrait of the Loyal Institutions. HarperCollins ISBN 978-0006388906
- English, Richard (2012). Armed Struggle: The History of the IRA (revised ed.). London: Pan Macmillan. ISBN 978-1447212492.
- Fairweather, Eileen; Roisin McDonough; Melanie McFadyean (1984). Only The Rivers Run Free: Northern Ireland: The Women's War. Pluto Press. ISBN 978-0861046683.
- Grant, Patrick (1999). Breaking Enmities: Religion, Literature and Culture in Northern Ireland, 1967–97. New York: St Martin's Press ISBN 978-0333698297
- Grant, Patrick (2001). Literature, Rhetoric, and Violence in Northern Ireland, 1968–1998: Hardened to Death. New York: Palgrave ISBN 0333794125
- Harnden, Toby (2000). Bandit Country: The IRA and South Armagh. Coronet Books ISBN 978-0340717370
- Henderson, Deric; Little, Ivan, eds. (2018). Reporting the Troubles: Journalists Tell Their Stories of the Northern Ireland conflict. Newtownards, County Down: Blackstaff Press. ISBN 978-1780731797.
- ————————; ————, eds. (2022). Reporting the Troubles 2: More Journalists Tell Their Stories of the Northern Ireland Conflict. Newtownards, County Down: Blackstaff Press. ISBN 978-1780733258.
- Hemming, Henry (2024). Four Shots in the Night: A True Story of Spies, Murder, and Justice in Northern Ireland. London: Quercus. ISBN 978-1529426755.
- Keefe, Patrick Radden (2018). Say Nothing: A True Story of Murder and Memory in Northern Ireland. William Collins ISBN 978-0008159252
- Kelly, Sheila P (2022). There Is No Flag Worth Dying For. A Mother's Memoir of Survival, Faith, and Family During The Troubles in Northern Ireland. Imprint: Independently published ISBN 9798359401876
- Kennedy, Liam (2020). Who Was Responsible for the Troubles?: The Northern Ireland Conflict. Montreal and Kingston: McGill-Queen's University Press. ISBN 978-0228003687.
- McDonald, Henry (2010). I.N.L.A – Deadly Divisions. Dublin: Poolbeg Press. ISBN 978-1781990551.
- McGartland, Martin (1997). Fifty Dead Men Walking: The True Story of a British Secret Agent inside the IRA. Hastings House ISBN 978-080389407-5
- McKittrick, David, and David McVea (2012). Making Sense of the Troubles: The Story of the Conflict in Northern Ireland Viking ISBN 978-024196265-7
- McKittrick, David (2001). Lost Lives: The Stories of the Men, Women and Children who Died as a Result of the Northern Ireland Troubles. Mainstream Publishing ISBN 978-1840185041
- McKittrick, David et al. (1996). The Fight for Peace: The Secret Story Behind the Irish Peace Process ISBN 978-0434003082
- Miller, David (1994). Don't Mention the War. Northern Ireland, Propaganda and the Media. London: Pluto
- Moloney, Ed (2010). Voices from the Grave: Two Men's War in Ireland. London: Faber and Faber. ISBN 978-0571251681.
- Myers, Kevin (2006). Watching the Door: Drinking Up, Getting Down, and Cheating Death in 1970s Belfast. Soft Skull Press ISBN 1-593762356
- O'Brien, Brendan (1999). The Long War: The IRA and Sinn Féin. Syracuse, New York: Syracuse University Press. ISBN 978-0815605973.
- O'Callaghan, Sean (1998). The Informer: The Real Life Story of One Man's War Against Terrorism. Bantam Books ISBN 0-593042859
- O'Doherty, Malachi (2019). Fifty Years On: The Troubles and the Struggle for Change in Northern Ireland. London: Atlantic Books. ISBN 978-1786496645.
- ———————— (2021). The Year of Chaos: Northern Ireland on the Brink of Civil War, 1971-72. London: Atlantic Books. ISBN 978-1838951221.
- Rolston, Bill (ed.) (1991). The Media and Northern Ireland: Covering the Troubles. Macmillan Academic and Professional Ltd. ISBN 0333515757
- Sanders, Andrew (2011). Inside the IRA: Dissident Republicans and the War for Legitimacy. Edinburgh: Edinburgh University Press. ISBN 978-0748646043.
- Schlesinger, Philip et al. (1983). Televising Terrorism: Political Violence in Popular Culture. London: Comedia
- Seymour, Gerald (1992). The Journeyman Tailor. HarperCollins ISBN 978-0060179984
- Sharrock, David, et al. (1998). Man of War, Man of Peace: The Unauthorised Biography of Gerry Adams. Pan Books ISBN 978-0330353960
- Stevenson, Jonathan (1996). "We Wrecked the Place": Contemplating an End to the Northern Irish Troubles. Free Press ISBN 068482745X
- Taylor, Peter (1998). Provos: The IRA and Sinn Féin. Bloomsbury ISBN 978-0-747538189
- Taylor, Peter (1999). Loyalists: War and Peace in Northern Ireland. Bloomsbury ISBN 978-0747545194
- Taylor, Peter (2000). Brits: The War Against the IRA. Bloomsbury ISBN 978-0747558064
- Toolis, Kevin (1995). Rebel Hearts: Journeys within the IRA's Soul. Picador ISBN 978-0330342438
- Urban, Mark (1992). Big Boys' Rules: The Secret Struggle Against the IRA. London: Faber and Faber. ISBN 978-0571168095.

== Fiction ==
- Beirne, Luke Francis. (2023) "Blacklion". Baraka Books.
- Brandner, Cindy. (2001) Exit Unicorns Series:
  - (2001) Exit Unicorns
  - (2007) Mermaid in a Bowl of Tears
  - (2012) Flights of Angels
  - (2013) Spindrift
  - (2016) In the Country of Shadows
  - (2018) Bare Knuckle
- Burns, Anna (2018). Milkman. London: Faber & Faber. ISBN 978-0571338740.
- Dummer, David A. (2025). Born of Bombs and Bullets. Baltimore: Bladen Crisfield Media. ISBN 979-8-9922312-0-5
- Hughes, Michael (2018). Country. London: John Murray. ISBN 978-1473636538.
- Hidcote, J. P. (2019). The Gortin Paradox: The Coulter Confessions Part 2. ISBN 978-1916176614.
- MacLaverty, Bernard (1988). Cal. Heinemann ISBN 978-0-435-12336-9
- McKinty, Adrian. Sean Duffy Series:
  - (2012). The Cold Cold Ground. Serpents Tail ISBN 978-1-616-14716-7
  - (2013). I Hear the Sirens in the Street. Serpents Tail ISBN 978-1-616-14787-7
  - (2014). In the Morning I'll Be Gone. Serpents Tail ISBN 978-1-616-14877-5
  - (2015). Gun Street Girl. Serpents Tail ISBN 978-1-633-88000-9
  - (2016). Rain Dogs. Serpents Tail ISBN 978-1-633-88130-3
- McNicholl, Damian (2004). A Son Called Gabriel ISBN 1-59315-018-0
- Patterson, Glenn (1999). The International
- Seymour, Gerald (1975). Harry's Game. Random House ISBN 978-0-394-49902-4
- Uris, Leon (1995). Trinity. Doubleday ISBN 978-1-568-65150-7
- Watts, Lee (2015). A Stone's Throw ISBN 978-1-5172-6492-5

== See also ==
- Directory of the Northern Ireland Troubles
- List of bombings during the Northern Ireland Troubles and peace process
- Timeline of the Northern Ireland Troubles and peace process
