= Belfast City Cemetery =

Cemetery in Northern Ireland

Coordinates: 54°35′23″N 5°58′45″W

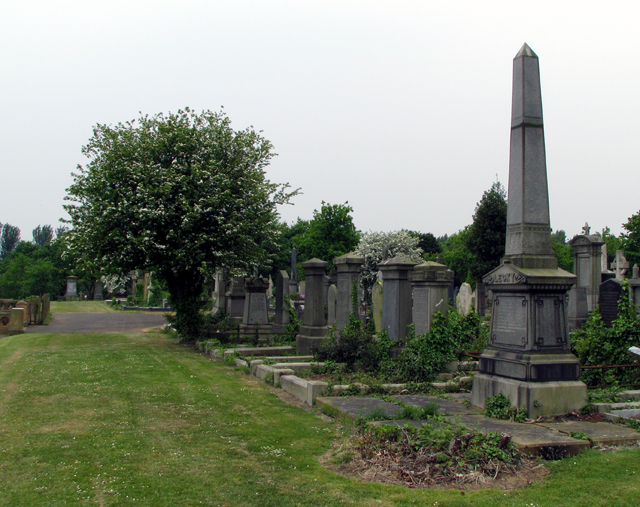
- Interactive map of Belfast City Cemetery

Details
- Established: 1869; 157 years ago
- Location: Belfast
- Country: Northern Ireland, UK
- Type: Public
- No. of graves: 226,000

Belfast City Cemetery (Irish: Reilig Chathair Bhéal Feirste) is a large cemetery in west Belfast, Northern Ireland. It lies within the townland of Ballymurphy, between Falls Road and Springfield Road, near Milltown Cemetery. Burial records have been fully digitized and are searchable online.

== History ==
Following the Belfast Burial Ground Act (1866), the cemetery was opened on 1 August 1869, as a cross denominational burial ground for the people of Belfast, a fast-growing Victorian town at the time. The land was purchased from Thomas Sinclair. The cemetery features cast iron fountains and separate Protestant and Catholic areas. Many of Belfast's wealthiest families have plots in the cemetery, particularly those involved in the linen trade. Since its opening in 1869 around 226,000 people have been buried in the cemetery.

In 1874 an area was set aside for Belfast's Jewish residents. In this section there is a memorial to Daniel Joseph Jaffe, father of Otto Jaffe, a Jewish linen exporter and former Lord Mayor of Belfast. Above the old Jewish entrance to the cemetery, Hebrew writing can clearly be identified.

In 1916 an area was dedicated to soldiers who died serving in World War I, when 296 Commonwealth service personnel were buried in the cemetery. Those whose graves could not be marked by headstones are listed on Screen Wall memorial in Plot H. Many of the United States Army personnel killed in the sinking of HMS Otranto in 1918 were buried in the graveyard. After the war their bodies were exhumed and repatriated to the United States.

In World War II, 274 Commonwealth service personnel, five of them unidentified, were buried in the cemetery, besides three Norwegian nationals whose graves are also maintained by the Commonwealth War Graves Commission.

== Developments ==
As the frequent target of vandalism, many of the British Army soldiers' headstones were moved to Sir Thomas and Lady Dixon Park. In 2012, continuing vandalism of the World War I Screen Wall has led to proposals to move it to another part of the cemetery. Due to its historical importance, the cemetery is a popular tourist attraction in Belfast, with guided tours available.

As part of a major heritage project the cemetery began a major upgrade in the early 2020s. This included the building of a visitor centre which has various displays about the history of the cemetery.

== Notable interments ==
- Sir Robert Anderson, 1st Baronet - politician, former Lord Mayor of Belfast.
- Robert Hugh Hanley Baird - businessman
- Margaret Byers - educator, activist, social reformer, missionary, and writer
- Sir George Clark, 1st Baronet - shipbuilder
- Frank Coombes (artist) - painter, architect, killed in the Belfast Blitz when serving in the Second World War.
- Samuel Cleland Davidson - inventor and founder of Belfast Sirocco Works
- Denis Donaldson - former IRA member and Sinn Féin politician; killed as a British spy.
- Vere Henry Louis Foster - educationist and philanthropist
- Tom Gallaher - tobacco merchant
- Edward Harland - shipbuilder and politician
- James Henderson - Unionist politician, former Lord Mayor of Belfast.
- Daniel Joseph Jaffe - Built Belfast's first synagogue; father of Otto Jaffe, former Lord Mayor of Belfast.
- Florence Augusta Lewis - mother of C.S. Lewis
- Robert Wilson Lynd - author
- William Henry Lynn - architect
- Arthur MacCaig - American documentary filmmaker.
- Thomas Macknight - Political author and biographer.
- Francis Maginn - missionary
- Valentine McMaster - Victoria Cross (VC) recipient (Indian Mutiny).
- Bernard McQuirt - VC recipient, Indian Mutiny. (Grave in pauper plot unmarked; commemorative headstone at Donaghcloney, County Armagh).
- Rinty Monaghan - boxer
- William Pirrie, 1st Viscount Pirrie
- Elisha Scott - football player
- Robert Thompson - politician
- Sam Thompson - playwright
- William Whitla - physician and politician
