= Belfast Jewish Community =

Jewish community in Belfast, Northern Ireland

- Location within Northern Ireland

Religion
- Affiliation: Orthodox Judaism
- Rite: Nusach Ashkenaz
- Ecclesiastical or organisational status: Synagogue
- Leadership: (vacant)
- Year consecrated: 1964
- Status: Active

Location
- Location: 49 Somerton Road, Belfast, County Antrim, Northern Ireland
- Country: United Kingdom
- Coordinates: 54°37′40″N 5°56′2″W

Architecture
- Architect: Eugene Rosenberg
- Type: Synagogue architecture
- Style: Modernist
- Established: 1870 (as a congregation)
- Completed: 1967

Website
- belfastjewishcommunity.org.uk

The Belfast Jewish Community (previously known as Belfast Hebrew Congregation) is the Jewish community in Belfast, Northern Ireland. Its most recent Rabbi was the Rev David Kale. The community follows the Ashkenazi Orthodox ritual. Membership has fluctuated from 78 in 1900, approximately 1500 during World War II, about 375 after World War II, to 350 in 1945, 380 in 1949 and 200 in 1999. The congregation was fewer than 80 people as of January 2015.

== History ==
Established in 1870, the congregation's first two "ministers" (rabbis) were Reverend Joseph Chotzner (serving from 1870 to 1880 and 1892 to 1897) and Rev. Jacob Myers. Daniel Joseoh Jaffe (father of Otto Jaffe), who came to Ireland in 1851, was instrumental in founding the synagogue. Later, the position was filled by Rabbi Yitzhak HaLevi Herzog (1916–1919), who later become Chief Rabbi of Ireland and Israel, and Rabbi Jacob Shachter (translator of Zvi Hirsch Chajes), 1926–1954.

Elizabeth Jane Caulfield, the Countess of Charlemont, regularly attended the synagogue and apparently converted to Judaism there.

Otto Jaffe, Lord Mayor of Belfast, was life-president of the Belfast Hebrew Congregation, which worshipped at the Great Victoria Street synagogue.

== Buildings ==
Currently located on Somerton Road, the congregation previously had the synagogue building on Annesley Street (1904–1964) and Great Victoria Street (1871–1904). (The foundation stones were dated 7 July 1871 and 26 February 1904.)

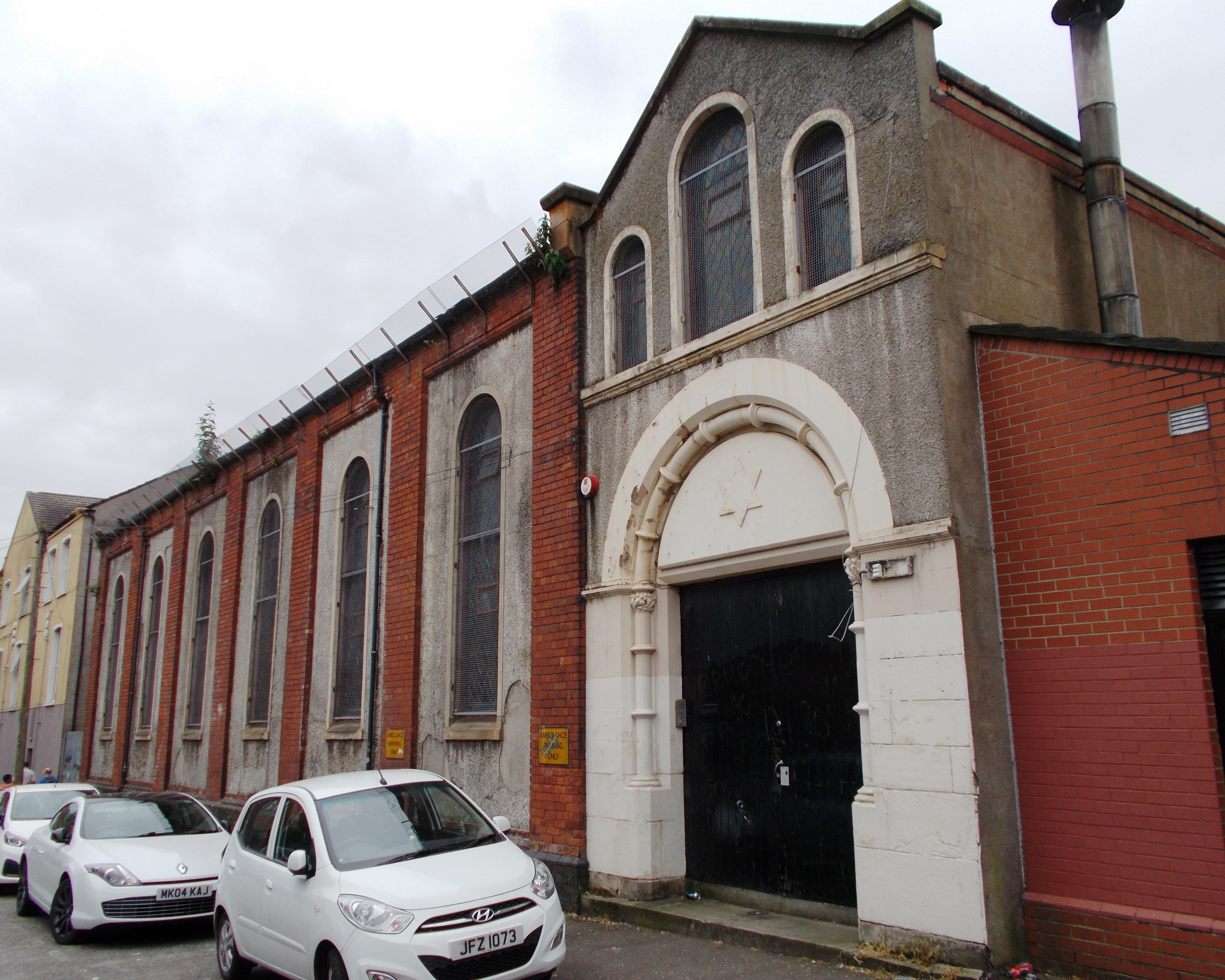
The community's former synagogue building on Annesley Street, Belfast

The synagogue, designed by Eugene Rosenberg, is unusual in that it is circular, not rectangular. There is no balcony for women, but a raised platform on either side. The roof is held up by concrete-covered beams that forms the shape of a Star of David. The candelabrum and eternal light, together with bronze and silver letters adorning the Ark doors, are by Israeli sculptor, Nehemia Azaz.

The synagogue has a plaque in memory of Jews killed during the Holocaust. Listed in the UK National Inventory of War Memorials, the English part of the inscription reads: "In memory of the martyred millions of European Jewry 1933–1945."

== See also ==
- History of the Jews in Northern Ireland
