= 1899 New Year Honours =

Queen Victoria's appointments

The 1899 New Year Honours were appointments by Queen Victoria to various orders and honours of the United Kingdom and British India.

They were published in The Times on 2 January 1899, and the various honours were gazetted in The London Gazette on 2 January 1899, 10 January 1899, and on 13 January 1899.

The recipients of honours are displayed or referred to as they were styled before their new honour, and arranged by honour and where appropriate by rank (Knight Grand Cross, Knight Commander, etc.) then divisions (Military, Civil).

== Peerages ==
=== Viscount ===
- Evelyn Baring, 1st Baron Cromer

=== Baron ===
- The Right Honourable Sir Philip Currie, GCB
- Sir Joseph Russell Bailey, Bart.
- Sir Henry Hawkins
- Robert Thornhagh Gurdon, Esq.

== Privy Council ==
- Sir William Walrond, Bart., MP
- Sir Charles Hall, KCMG, MP, Recorder of London
- Colonel Edward James Saunderson, MP
- William Kenrick, Esq., MP

== Privy Council of Ireland ==
- Windham Wyndham-Quin, 4th Earl of Dunraven and Mount-Earl, KP
- Colonel Edward Henry Cooper, Her Majesty′s Lord Lieutenant for County Sligo

== Baronetcy ==
- Sir Henry Thompson, FRCS
- William Henry Hornby, Esq., MP
- Francis Tress Barry, MP
- John Murray Scott

== Knight Bachelor ==
- Thomas Townsend Bucknill, QC, justice of the High Court
- Fortescue Flannery, MP
- John Furley, Commissioner to National Aid Society
- Edward Lawrence, JP and Mayor of Liverpool in 1864–65
- Henry Evelyn Oakeley, lately Chief Inspector of Schools at the Education Department
- David Richmond, Lord Provost of Glasgow
- Hermann Weber, MD
- Arthur Strachey, LLD, Chief Justice of the High Court, Allahabad
- William Mure, late Senior Puisne Judge of the Supreme Court of the Colony of Mauritius
- James Henderson, Lord Mayor of Belfast
- John Barr Johnston, the Mayor of Londonderry
- John Chute Neligan, Recorder of Cork
- Dr. Plunkett O′Farrell, Commissioner of Control and Inspector of Lunatic Asylums in Ireland

Other 1899 Knights Bachelor

- John Thomas Soundby, JP and Mayor of Windsor (May 24)

== The Most Honourable Order of the Bath ==
=== Knight Grand Cross of the Order of the Bath (GCB) ===
Civil Division

- Sir Hugh Owen, KCB, late Permanent Secretary to the Local Government Board
- Sir Charles Lennox Peel, KCB, late Clerk of the Council

=== Knights Commander of the Order of the Bath (KCB) ===
Civil Division

- Carey John Knyvett, Esq., CB, late Principal Clerk, Home Office
- Henry Primrose, Esq., CB, CSI
- William Chandler Roberts-Austen, CB, FRS, Chemist and Assayer to the Royal Mint
- Edward Wingfield, Permanent Under-Secretary of State for the Colonies

=== Companions of the Order of the Bath (CB) ===
Civil division

- Charles Henry Alderson, Esq., Charity Commissioner
- Jasper Capper Badcock, Esq., Controller of London Postal Service
- Robert Henry Boyce, Esq., Office of Works
- Evelyn Ruggles-Brise, Esq., Chairman of the Prison Commission
- Sir Charles Cameron, Bart., MD
- Henry Cockburn, Chinese Secretary to Legation, Peking
- Lieutenant-Colonel Arthur Collins, MVO
- Honourable Sidney Robert Greville, Esq.
- Frederick John Jackson, Esq., Her Majesty′s Vice Consul and First Class Assistant, Uganda
- John Joseph Casimer Jones, Esq., Chief Commissioner, Dublin Metropolitan Police
- Walter Loois Frederick Goltz Langley, Esq., Foreign Office
- Henry Walrond Simpkinson, Esq., Education Department
- John Steele, Chief Inspector of Excise
- George Wilson, Her Majesty′s Vice Consul and First Class Assistant, Uganda

== Order of the Star of India ==
=== Knights Commander of the Order of the Star of India (KCSI) ===
- His Highness Rasul Khanji Mahabat Khanji, Nawab of Junagarh
- Charles Cecil Stevens, Esq., CSI, Indian Civil Service

=== Companions of the Order of the Star of India (CSI) ===
- Mackenzie Dalzell Chalmers, Esq., Member of the Governor-General's Council.
- Arundel Tagg Arundel, Esq, Indian Civil Service.
- Lieutenant-Colonel Donald Robertson, Indian Staff Corps.
- His Highness Raja Kirti Sah of Tehri Garhwal
- John Prescott Hewett, Esq., CIE, Indian Civil Service.
- Colonel William Pleace Warburton, MD, Indian Medical Service.
- Colonel David Sinclair, MB, Indian Medical Service.

== Order of St Michael and St George ==
=== Knights Grand Cross of the Order of St Michael and St George (GCMG) ===
- The Right Honourable Henry Brand, 2nd Viscount Hampden, Governor and Commander-in-Chief of the Colony of New South Wales.
- Sir Thomas Fowell Buxton, Bart., KCMG, Governor and Commander-in-Chief of the Colony of South Australia.
- His Excellency the Right Honourable Sir Charles Stewart Scott, KCMG, CB, Her Majesty's Ambassador at St. Petersburg
- Major-General Sir Herbert Charles Chermside, Royal Engineers, KCMG, CB, Her Majesty's Military Commissioner in Crete, for distinguished services in Crete

=== Knights Commander of the Order of St Michael and St George (KCMG) ===
- Sir John Madden, Chief Justice of the Supreme Court of the Colony of Victoria, who has on several occasions administered the government of the Colony.
- William Turner Thiselton Dyer, Esq., CMG, CIE, Director of the Royal Botanic Gardens, Kew, in recognition of services rendered to Colonial Governments.
- Nevile Lubbock, Esq., Chairman of the West India Committee, for services rendered in connection with the West Indian Colonies.
- Henry Howard, Esq., CB, Her Majesty's Envoy Extraordinary and Minister Plenipotentiary at The Hague
- Edmund Douglas Veitch Fane, Esq., Her Majesty's Envoy Extraordinary and Minister Plenipotentiary at Copenhagen
- Colonel James Hayes Sadler, late Her Majesty's Consul-General at Valparaíso

=== Honorary Knight Commander of the order of St Michael and St George ===
- Boutros Pasha Ghali, Foreign Minister to His Highness the Khedive of Egypt

=== Companions of the Order of St Michael and St George (CMG) ===
- Major-General William Julius Gascoigne, lately General Officer Commanding the Militia of Canada.
- Charles Walter Sneyd Kynnersley, Esq, Resident Councillor at Penang.
- Major (local Colonel) James Willcocks, DSO, for services with the West African Frontier Force on the Niger.
- Frank Rohrweger, Esq., for services as Political Officer attached to the Forces in the Lagos Protectorate.
- Major John Hanbury-Williams, Military Secretary to the Governor and Commander-in-Chief of the Colony of the Cape of Good Hope.
- Matthew Nathan, Royal Engineers, Secretary to the Colonial Defence Committee.
- Major the Honourable Charles Granville Fortescue, for services in the Northern Territories of the Gold Coast.
- Captain John George Orlebar Aplin, Inspector in the Gold Coast Constabulary.
- Captain Sir Edward Chichester, Bart., Royal Navy, for services during recent events at Manila
- Major Henry Lionel Gallwey, DSO, Her Majesty's Acting Commissioner and Consul General for the Niger Coast Protectorate
- Major James Henry Bor, Deputy Assistant Adjutant-General, for services in Crete
- Robert Unwin Moffat, Esq., MB, for service during the recent Uganda mutiny
- James Simpson Macpherson, Esq., for service during the recent Uganda mutiny
- William Grant, Esq., for service during the recent Uganda mutiny

== Order of the Indian Empire ==
=== Knights Commander of the Order of the Indian Empire (KCIE) ===
- Andrew Wingate, Esq., CIE, Indian Civil Service.
- Kunwar Harnam Singh, Ahluwalia, CIE, of Kapurthala.
- Major-General Gerald de Courcy Morton, CB
- Major-General George Corrie Bird, CB, Indian Staff Corps.

=== Companions of the Order of the Indian Empire (CIE) ===
- Joy Gobind Law, Esq., Additional Member of the Legislative Council of the Governor-General.
- Lieutenant-Colonel Henry Kellock McKay, Indian Medical Service.
- John Sime, Esq, Director of Public Instruction in the Punjab.
- Alexander Izat, Esq
- Rai Bahadur Thakur Mangal Singh
- Rai Bahadur Dhanpat Rai Sardar Bahadur
- Khan Bahadur Dhanjibhai Fakirji Commodore
- Major Winthropp Benjamin Browning, Indian Medical Service
- Major John Joseph Holdsworth, Gorakhpur Light Horse
- Francis Jack Needham, Esq
- Edulji Dinshah

== Personal salute of 21 guns ==
- His Highness Shri Padmanabha Dasa Vanji Sir Balarania Varma Kulashekhara Kritapati Mani Sultan Maharaja Raja Rama Raja Bahadur Shamsher Jang, of Travancore, GCSI
