= Grace note (disambiguation) =

A grace note is a kind of music notation used to denote several kinds of musical ornaments.

Grace note, grace notes, or other variations may also refer to:

- Gracenote, a company that maintains a music database
- Gracenote (band), a Filipino band
- Grace Notes, a 1997 novel by Bernard MacLaverty
- "Grace Note" (The Twilight Zone), an episode of the 1985-1989 revival of the TV series
