= Best & Bester =

- Genre: Comedy
- Created by: Anttu Harlin; Joonas Utti
- Developed by: Kyle Hart
- Written by: Ciaran Murtagh; Andrew Barnett-Jones
- Directed by: Kitty Taylor
- Voices of: Rupert Simonian; Kathryn Drysdale
- Theme music composer: Voodoo Highway Music
- Composer: Justin Delorme
- Countries of origin: Finland; United Kingdom; Canada
- Original language: English
- No. of seasons: 1
- No. of episodes: 26 (51 segments)

Production
- Executive producers: Anttu Harlin; Joonas Utti; Genevieve Dexter; Jules Coke; Colin Bohm; Pam Westman
- Producers: Georgia Dussaud; Laurie Handforth
- Running time: 22 minutes
- Production companies: Gigglebug; Eye Present; Nelvana

Original release
- Network: YTV (Canada); Yle TV2/Yle Areena (Finland); Nickelodeon (UK)
- Release: September 3, 2022 – January 29, 2023

Best & Bester (Finnish: Eka & Helmi) is an animated comedy television series created by Anttu Harlin and Joonas Utti. The series is produced by Gigglebug in Finland, and animated by Eye Present in the United Kingdom and Nelvana in Canada.

Best & Bester premiered on Nickelodeon in the UK on September 3, 2022, on YTV in Canada on September 18, 2022, and on Yle TV2 via the Galaxi programming block in Finland on March 11, 2023, with episodes released on Yle Areena the same day. Internationally, the series airs on Nickelodeon.

== Premise ==
Best & Bester, twins in a town called Betterville, have a unique ability to choose a new body at will. This is in contrast to other Betterville residents which only have one form forever. They go on various adventures with their friends and neighbors.

== Characters ==
- Best (voiced by Rupert Simonian) – Is a pink crown, Bester's brother
- Bester (voiced by Kathryn Drysdale) – Is a green-heart, Best's sister. She is afraid of camels.
- Grumpy Pants (voiced by Bill Bailey) – Is a brown pants with glasses, Best and Bester's grumpy neighbor.
- Flip Flop (voiced by Kosha Engler) – Is Best and Bester's best friend who runs a milkshake stand.
- Diamondo (voiced by Joseph Balderrama) – He is rich and he likes shiny things. Sometimes also hangs out with Best & Bester.
- Rocky (voiced by Akiya Henry) – She is usually shy and quiet, but she likes to hang out with everyone. She is a good friend of Best & Bester. She is a member of the "Book Club" with several other friends.
- Toot (voiced by Harriet Carmichael) – She is a passionate comedian, she tells jokes all the time. However, no one really laughs at them. She is a good friend of Best & Bester.
- Grafifi (voiced by Pearl Mackie) – She is light and athletic, skilled in physical activity and mechanics. She is presented as a "rebellious spirit", and prefers to do things her way instead of following everyone else. She also likes to show off to others.

== Episodes ==
No.	Title	Written by	Original release date	Prod. code
1	"Cactus Sitting"	Ciaran Murtagh & Andrew Barnett-Jones	September 3, 2022 (Note: This episode was released on YouTube on August 27, 2022.)	101
1	"Disaster of Hole 2"	Shane Langan & Amy Stephenson	September 3, 2022	101
2	"Get the Hump"	Kristina Yee	September 4, 2022	102
2	"Sing for Your Supper"	Aidan O'Donovan & Colm Tobin	September 4, 2022	102
3	"The Big Game"	Alex Collier	September 10, 2022	103
3	"Get Your Skate On"	Alex Collier	September 10, 2022	103
4	"Get Shirty"	Ciaran Morrison & Mick O'Hara	September 11, 2022	104
4	"This Solves Nothing"	Howard Read	September 11, 2022	104
5	"Rock-a-Bye Besty"	Howard Read	September 17, 2022	105
5	"Shake or Break"	Tim Bain	September 17, 2022	105
6	"Tenta-Flakes"	Dilpreet Kaur Walia	September 18, 2022	106
6	"Boss Level"	Shane Langan & Amy Stephenson	September 18, 2022	106
7	"Stage Struck"	Lisa Kohn	September 24, 2022	107
7	"Ball Count"	Ciaran Morrison & Mick O'Hara	September 24, 2022	107
8	"Bucket Pants"	Howard Read	September 25, 2022	108
8	"A Best Too Far"	Ciaran Murtagh & Andrew Barnett-Jones	September 25, 2022	108
9	"Spoiler Alert"	Shane Langan & Amy Stephenson	December 12, 2022	109A
10	"Something Fishy"	Kyle Hart, Ciaran Murtagh & Andrew Barnett-Jones	December 13, 2022	109B
11	"Fair Share"	Gemma Arrowsmith	December 14, 2022	110A
12	"Power Plant"	Hannah George	December 15, 2022	110B
13	"Best Fwends"	Shane Langan & Amy Stephenson	December 16, 2022	111A
14	"The Trivialist Pursuit"	Shane Langan & Amy Stephenson	December 19, 2022	111B
15	"Bad Eggs"	Kyle Hart	December 20, 2022	112A
16	"Out of Bounds"	Hannah George	December 21, 2022	112B
17	"Robo Stomp"	Ciaran Murtagh & Andrew Barnett-Jones	December 22, 2022	113A
18	"Wood You?"	Kyle Hart, Ciaran Murtagh & Andrew Barnett-Jones	December 23, 2022	113B
19	"Chess-A-Pult"	Ciaran Murtagh & Andrew Barnett-Jones	December 27, 2022	114
19	"Smart & Smarter"	Lisa Kohn	December 27, 2022	114
20	"Taken to the Cleaners"	Ciaran Murtagh & Andrew Barnett-Jones	December 29, 2022	115
20	"Mugshot"	Ciaran Murtagh & Andrew Barnett-Jones	December 29, 2022	115
21	"In the Sky with Diamondo"	Gemma Arrowsmith	January 14, 2023	116
21	"Best Buddies"	Isabel Fay	January 14, 2023	116
22	"Donut Disturb"	Alex Collier	January 15, 2023	117
22	"The Cursed Amulet"	Dilpreet Kaur Walia	January 15, 2023	117
23	"Animal Hearts"	Alex Collier	January 17, 2023	121
23	"Beast & Beaster"	Howard Read	January 17, 2023	121
24	"That's So Cupid"	Tim Bain	January 21, 2023	118
24	"Buddy Odour"	Ciaran Murtagh & Andrew Barnett-Jones	January 21, 2023	118
25	"Fight or Flight"	Ciaran Murtagh & Andrew Barnett-Jones	January 22, 2023	119
25	"Employee of the Month"	Alex Collier	January 22, 2023	119
26	"Stuck Inside"	Alex Collier	January 28, 2023	120A
27	"Long Overdue"	James Bishop & Chris Douch	January 29, 2023	120B
TBA	"Rocky the Vote"	Howard Read	TBA	122
TBA	"One Star Hotel"	James Bishop & Chris Douch	TBA	122
TBA	"That Sinkhole Feeling"	Ciaran Murtagh & Andrew Barnett-Jones	TBA	123
TBA	"Like a Brother"	Isabel Fay	TBA	123
TBA	"Funny Money"	Alex Collier	TBA	124
TBA	"Shaking Bad"	Shane Langan & Amy Stephenson	TBA	124
TBA	"Pulling Power"	Isabel Fay	TBA	125
TBA	"Home Security"	Howard Read	TBA	125
TBA	"One Better Day"	Ciaran Murtagh & Andrew Barnett-Jones	TBA	126

== Broadcast ==
The series began its broadcast in the United Kingdom on Nickelodeon on September 3, 2022, and in Canada on YTV on September 18, 2022.

It was broadcast on Nickelodeon in Australia and New Zealand on June 27, 2022; also, several episodes were broadcast for the first time on Nickelodeon in Latin America, and Nick Jr. in Italy.

In Finland, the series was broadcast on Yle TV2 on March 11, 2023, under the name Eka & Helmi. The 26 episodes of the series were released at the same time of day on the streaming service Yle Areena (PI).

In France, the series began broadcasting on August 31, 2023 on Nickelodeon.
