= Daniel Joseph Jaffe (merchant) =

German merchant

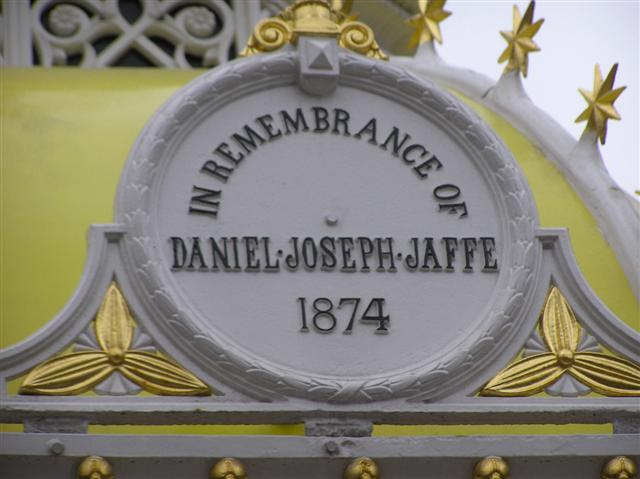
Plaque from Jaffe Memorial Fountain, Belfast

Daniel Joseph Jaffe (19 August 1809–21 January 1874) was a German merchant who came to Belfast in 1850 to establish a linen export business. He is regarded as the founder of Belfast's Jewish community and built the city's first synagogue in 1871. He was the father of Otto Jaffe, who was twice Lord Mayor of Belfast and its first and only Jewish Lord Mayor.

Prior to coming to Belfast, Jaffe owned a considerable mercantile business in Hamburg. His business was also active in Dundee, Leipzig, and Paris. Born in Schwerin, Mecklenburg-Vorpommern in 1809, he died in Nice, France in 1874 aged 64 and is interred in the Jewish section of Belfast City Cemetery.

In 1874, the same year of his death, a drinking fountain was erected to his memory at Victoria Square in Belfast. In 2007, the monument was taken to Shropshire, England to be repaired due to its poor condition and was returned to its original location in February 2008.
