= Robert Hugh Hanley Baird =

Baird in 1928.

Sir Robert Hugh Hanley Baird KBE (1855–1934) was a newspaper proprietor from Northern Ireland. He was born in Belfast and educated at Model School and Royal Belfast Academical Institution. In 1869, he entered the firm of W. & G. Baird, Arthur Street, Belfast, and was present at the first publication of The Telegraph, on 1 September 1870. Baird served as managing director of W & G Baird from 1886 until his death in 1934. He founded and owned a series of newspapers, including: the Belfast Weekly Telegraph (1873), Ballymena Weekly Telegraph (1887), Ireland's Saturday Night (1894), Belfast Telegraph (1904), Irish Daily Telegraph (1904) and The Larne Times (1891).

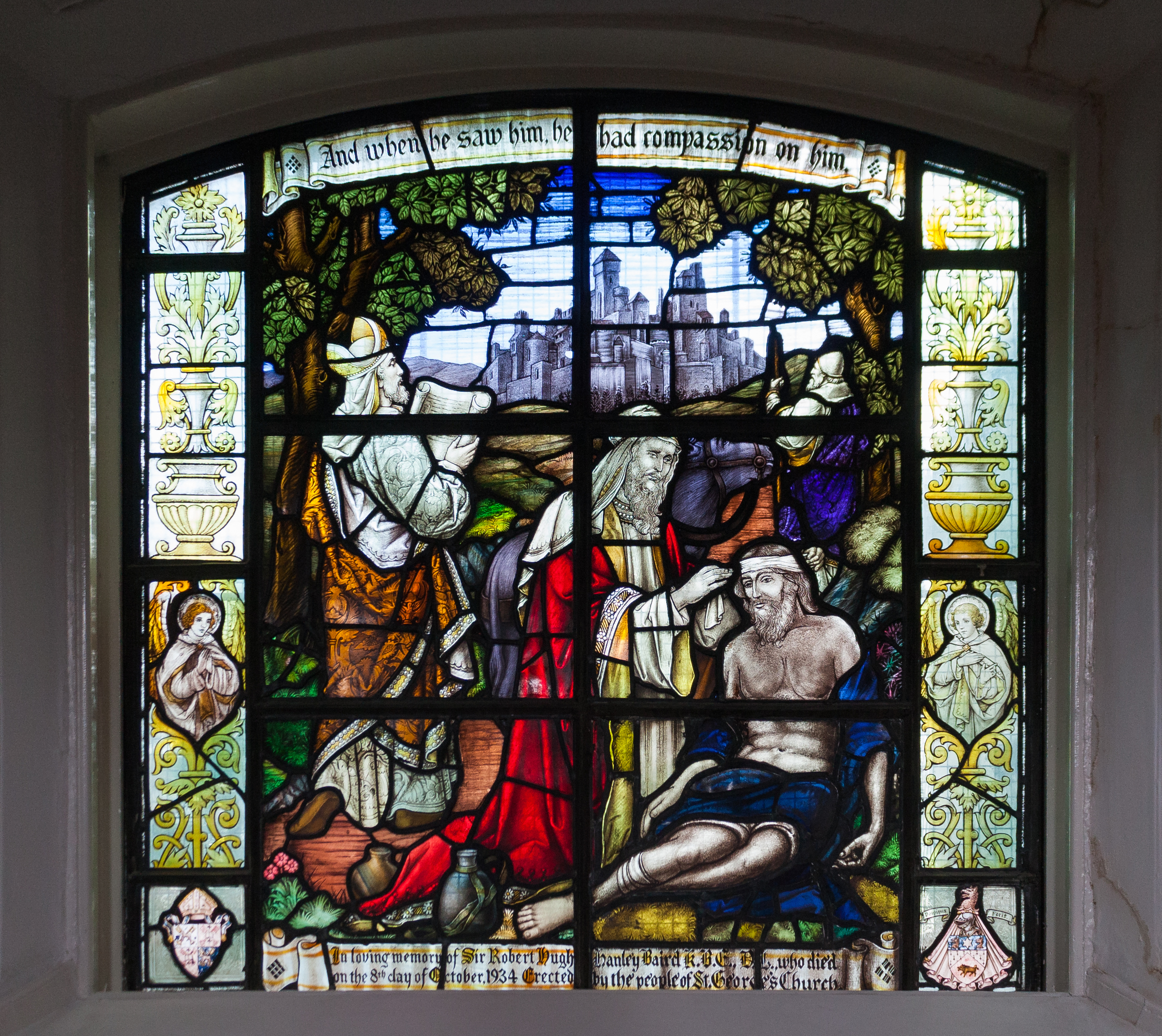
Stained glass window erected in memory of Baird

Baird was a lifelong member and supporter of St George's Church, Belfast. He died in 1934 and is buried in Belfast City Cemetery. After his death a stained glass window by Clokey & Co. in Belfast was erected in his memory by the parishioners of his church, depicting the Good Samaritan.

== Offices Held ==
- President, Master Printers' Federation of Great Britain and Ireland, 1910
- President, Irish Newspaper Society, 1913–1925
- Chairman, Ulster District, Institute of Journalists, 1916 and Fellow of the Institute
- Chairman, Belfast District, Newspaper Press Fund, 1910–1934
- Irish Representative, Admiralty, War Office and Press Committee 1916-1934
- Member Advisory Trade Committee of Paper Commission
- Freeman, City of London and Member of Worshipful Company of Stationers (1921–1934)
- Member of Senate of Queen's University, Belfast (1929–1934).

== Arms ==
Coat of arms of Robert Hugh Hanley Baird
Notes Granted 1 December 1924 by Sir Nevile Rodwell Wilkinson, Ulster King of Arms. Crest On a wreath of the colours a griffin's head erased Proper langued Argent. Escutcheon Per chevron Ermine and Gules in base a boar passant Or on a chief Azure a star of six points Argent between two griffins' heads erased Proper. Motto Dominus Fecit
