= At the Edge of the Union =

BBC TV documentary programme

At the Edge of the Union is a 1985 BBC documentary produced by Paul Hamman about the Troubles in Northern Ireland as part of its Real Life series of documentaries. Gregory Campbell of the Democratic Unionist Party and Sinn Féin's Martin McGuiness were interviewed for the film, each receiving equal airtime.

The film was scheduled to air on 7 August 1985, however due to the politically sensitive nature of its content, it was not broadcast. The British government was alerted to the upcoming release by The Sunday Times. Hamman was concerned that there would be low viewing figures for the documentary, so he contacted the newspaper to increase publicity. Government reaction was immediately negative. Douglas Hurd, Secretary of State for Northern Ireland, said he was "alarmed" by the prospective documentary. Leon Brittan, the Home Secretary, asked the BBC not to air the production, arguing that it was "wholly contrary to the public interest". Although Brittan had not viewed the film, he still felt that its showing would "materially assist the terrorist cause".

On 30 July an emergency meeting of the BBC's Board of Governors was convened, after viewing the film they decided against showing it. As both Campbell and McGuiness were shown living their lives in Derry, it received criticism for perceived normalization of terrorists. One board member, Daphne Park, objected to what she considered the "domestication of the IRA", feeling that the programme portrayed them as "lovable people with babies". Another member, Lucy Faulkner, reported that she was "frightened" when viewing the film. The deputy of the Director-General of the BBC, Michael Checkland, tried in vain to convince the board not to ban the film, as he thought to do so would be to compromise the BBC's "actual and perceived independence".

The documentary was created during a time when there was considerable debate about freedom of speech and BBC bias in the United Kingdom. During this period there was the Zircon affair, the controversy over the publication of the book Spycatcher, and Conservative Party Chairman Norman Tebbit's statements that the BBC produced biased coverage. However the decision by the BBC's board not to broadcast At the Edge of the Union was the most controversial of all. At the time The Guardian described it as "the greatest constitutional crisis in the history of British broadcasting", while the then-Director General of the BBC said the furor "rocked the BBC to its foundations". The withdrawal has been cited as an instance of the BBC's editorial independence being breached by government pressure.

In response to the cancellation, the National Union of Journalists organized a one-day strike in protest. It took place on August 7, the day the documentary was to have been aired. On that day there were no national news bulletins and the BBC World Service played music for the entirety of the day. It was the first one-day strike in the BBC's history. This led to a compromise by the BBC, the film would be aired on 16 October 1985, albeit with three minor alterations. The broadcast was estimated to have attracted an audience short of 5 million.

== See also ==
- 1988–1994 British broadcasting voice restrictions
- The Secret Army
