= James Henderson (Irish politician) =

Irish politician

Sir James Henderson, as Lord Mayor

Sir James Henderson (28 April 1846 – 1 May 1914) was an Irish Unionist politician, who served as Lord Mayor of Belfast between 1898 and 1899. He was also the first High Sheriff of Belfast.

Born in Belfast on 28 April 1846, he read law at Trinity College Dublin and was called to the Irish bar in 1872. He was knighted in the 1899 New Year Honours. He was married to Martha Pollock, and they had five sons. He died on 1 May 1914 and is buried in Belfast City Cemetery.

== Arms ==
Coat of arms of James Henderson
Notes Confirmed 19 June 1899 by Sir Arthur Edward Vicars, Ulster King of Arms. Crest A cubit arm erect between two oak laurels Proper the hand grasping an estoille of eight points wavy Or ensigned with a crescent Azure. Escutcheon Per pale indented Gules and Or on a chief Vair a crescent between two bells of the second. Motto Sola Virgus Nobilitat

Civic offices
Preceded by John Savage	Mayor of Belfast; 1873–1874	Succeeded by Thomas Graham Lindsay
Preceded by William James Pirrie	Lord Mayor of Belfast; 1898–1899	Succeeded by Otto Jaffe
New office	High Sheriff of Belfast; 1900–1901	Succeeded by Otto Jaffe
