= The Crying Game =

1992 film by Neil Jordan

- UK quad poster
- Directed by: Neil Jordan
- Written by: Neil Jordan
- Produced by: Stephen Woolley; Nik Powell
- Starring: Stephen Rea; Miranda Richardson; Jaye Davidson; Forest Whitaker
- Cinematography: Ian Wilson
- Edited by: Kant Pan
- Music by: Anne Dudley
- Production companies: Palace Pictures; Channel Four Films; British Screen; Nippon Film Development
- Distributed by: Palace Pictures
- Release dates: 2 September 1992 (Venice); 30 October 1992 (U.K.); 19 June 1993 (Japan)
- Running time: 111 minutes
- Countries: United Kingdom; Japan
- Language: English
- Budget: £2.1 million
- Box office: $71 million

The Crying Game is a 1992 crime thriller film written and directed by Neil Jordan, produced by Stephen Woolley and Nik Powell, and starring Stephen Rea, Miranda Richardson, Jaye Davidson, Adrian Dunbar, Ralph Brown, and Forest Whitaker. The film explores themes of race, sexuality, and identity.

The Crying Game follows the fictional character of Fergus (Rea), a member of the Provisional Irish Republican Army (IRA). He develops a brief but meaningful friendship with a black British soldier, Jody (Whitaker), who has been taken captive by the IRA. Jody asks Fergus to look after his girlfriend, Dil (Davidson), in the event of his demise.

A critical and commercial success, The Crying Game won a BAFTA Award for Outstanding British Film as well as an Academy Award for Best Original Screenplay. The film also received Oscar nominations for Best Picture, Best Director, Best Actor for Rea, Best Supporting Actor for Davidson, and Best Film Editing. In 1999, the British Film Institute named it the 26th-greatest British film of all time.

== Plot ==
At a rural fairground in Northern Ireland, a Provisional Irish Republican Army (IRA) unit kidnaps Jody, a Black British soldier. A female member of the IRA unit, Jude, had lured Jody to a secluded area by promising sex. The unit intends to hold Jody in exchange for the release of an imprisoned IRA member; if the prisoner is not released within three days, the unit plans to execute Jody.

Fergus, a volunteer in the unit, is assigned to stand guard over Jody. The men bond, with Jody relating the fable of the Scorpion and the Frog to Fergus. Aware that he may not survive, Jody asks Fergus to find his lover Dil and check on Dil's well-being in the event of his demise. When the captors' deadline passes without their demands being met, Fergus is ordered to take Jody into the woods to kill him. However, Jody attempts to escape and Fergus, unwilling to shoot Jody in the back, chases after him. As Jody flees, he runs across a road and is struck and killed by an oncoming Alvis Saracen.

The British Army attacks the IRA unit and Fergus escapes, believing his companions to have died in the attack. He flees to London, assuming the alias "Jimmy" and finding work as a day labourer. A few months later, Fergus finds Dil at a hair salon, where Jody had told him that she worked as a stylist. He follows Dil to a bar, and they flirt. Fergus and Dil develop a relationship, and Fergus falls in love with Dil. As the two are about to become intimate, Dil undresses, and Fergus sees Dil's male genitalia. Fergus, initially repulsed, accidentally hits Dil in the face and leaves Dil's apartment. After some reflection, he apologizes to Dil in a note, and they reconcile.

Around the same time, Jude reappears and coerces Fergus into helping with an assassination plot against a British judge, using the threat of harm to Dil to ensure his cooperation. The night before the planned assassination, Fergus stays at Dil’s apartment and confesses his role in Jody's death. An intoxicated Dil does not appear to fully comprehend his words.

In the morning, Dil restrains Fergus, preventing him from participating in the assassination. The IRA unit's leader shoots the judge and is shot and killed by the judge's bodyguards. Seeking revenge, Jude enters Dil's flat with a gun. Dil overpowers Jude and shoots her dead after learning of her involvement in Jody's death. After pointing the gun at Fergus, Dil spares him, stating that Jody would not want him killed. Dil then becomes suicidal. Fergus, freed from his restraints, prevents Dil from committing suicide and allows Dil to escape. He wipes Dil's fingerprints from the gun and takes the blame for Jude's death.

Months later, Dil visits Fergus in prison and asks why he took the fall for the shooting. He responds, "As a man once said, it's in my nature". He begins to recount the story of the Scorpion and the Frog.

== Cast ==
- Stephen Rea as Fergus
- Miranda Richardson as Jude
- Forest Whitaker as Jody
- Jaye Davidson as Dil
- Adrian Dunbar as Peter Maguire
- Tony Slattery as Deveroux
- Jim Broadbent as Col
- Birdy Sweeney as Tommy
- Ralph Brown as Dave
- Andrée Bernard as Jane
- Joe Savino as Eddie
- Breffni McKenna as Tinker
- Jack Carr as Franknum

== Production ==
Neil Jordan first drafted the screenplay in the mid-1980s under the title The Soldier's Wife, but shelved the project after a similar film was released. The screenplay was partly inspired by a 1931 short story by Frank O'Connor, "Guests of the Nation", in which IRA soldiers develop a bond with English hostages they are ultimately forced to kill.

Jordan sought to begin production of the film in the early 1990s, but found it difficult to secure financing, as the script's controversial themes and his recent string of box office flops discouraged potential investors. Several funding offers from the United States fell through because the funders wanted Jordan to cast a woman to play the role of Dil, believing that it would be impossible to find an androgynous male actor who could pass as female. Derek Jarman eventually referred Jordan to Jaye Davidson, who was completely new to acting and was spotted by a casting agent while attending a premiere party for Jarman's film Edward II. Rea later said, "'If Jaye hadn't been a completely convincing woman, my character would have looked stupid'".

The film went into production with an inadequate patchwork of funding, leading to a stressful and unstable filming process. The producers constantly searched for small amounts of money to keep the production going, and the unreliable pay left crew members disgruntled. Costume designer Sandy Powell had an extremely small budget to work with and ended up having to lend Davidson some of her own clothes to wear in the film, as the two happened to be the same size.

The film was known as The Soldier's Wife for much of its production, but Stanley Kubrick, a friend of Jordan, counselled against the title, which he said would lead audiences to expect a war film. The opening sequence was shot in Laytown, County Meath, Ireland, and the rest in London and Burnham Beeches, Buckinghamshire, England. The bulk of the film's London scenes were shot in the East End, specifically Hoxton and Spitalfields. Dil's flat is in a building facing onto Hoxton Square, with the exterior of the Metro on nearby Coronet Street. Fergus's flat and Dil's hair salon are both in Spitalfields. Chesham Street in Belgravia was the location for the assassination of the judge, with the now-defunct Lowndes Arms pub just around the corner.

== Release ==
The initial box office failure of The Crying Game was attributed to the film's heavily political undertone, and particularly to its sympathetic portrayal of an IRA fighter.

The film became notable for a plot twist in which a nude scene reveals that the character Dil is transgender. (Note: Neil Jordan has said that he saw the character of Dil as "a transvestite and a gay man, basically... not a transsexual".)

The then-fledgling film studio Miramax Films decided to promote the film in the U.S., where it became a sleeper hit. A memorable advertising campaign generated intense public curiosity by asking audiences not to reveal the film's plot twist regarding Dil's gender identity. Those surveyed by CinemaScore on opening night gave the film a grade of "B" on a scale of A+ to F.

=== Critical reception ===
The Crying Game received critical acclaim. As of June 2026, the film had a 95% rating on Rotten Tomatoes based on 73 reviews. The consensus states, "The Crying Game is famous for its shocking twist, but this thoughtful, haunting mystery grips the viewer from start to finish." On the review aggregator website, Metacritic the film has a score of 90 out of 100 based on 22 reviews; this score indicates "universal acclaim".

Roger Ebert awarded the film a rating of four out of four stars, describing it as a movie that "involves us deeply in the story" and then "reveals that the story is really about something else altogether". Ebert named The Crying Game "one of the best films of 1992".

In Time, Richard Corliss alluded to the film's secret by means of an acrostic. Corliss formed the sentence "she is a he" from the first letter of each paragraph.

Much has been written about The Crying Game's discussion of race, nationality, and sexuality. Theorist and author Jack Halberstam argued that the viewer's placement in Fergus's point of view regarding Dil being transgender reinforces societal norms rather than challenging them.

David Cronenberg stated that he was disappointed by M. Butterfly's reception and felt that it was overshadowed by The Crying Game. He said that the films paralleled each other as both were transsexual, transracial, and transcultural. He was critical of The Crying Game, stating that the film "copped out". Cronenberg asserted that Fergus should have killed Jody in the film, reasoning that if Fergus had done so, he would have felt more guilt and the movie would have been "much more powerful".

CinemaSight.com states that the film "explores race, identity, sexuality, and perception".

Based on a poll of 106 film critics, The Crying Game was placed on over 50 critics' ten-best lists in 1992.

The February 2020 issue of New York lists The Crying Game as among "The Best Movies That Lost Best Picture at the Oscars."

=== Box office ===
The Crying Game grossed £2 million ($3 million) in the United Kingdom. The film was more successful in the United States and Canada, grossing $62.5 million and becoming Miramax's highest-grossing film in that market at the time. Based on Screen International's definition of a British film, The Crying Game also became the second-highest grossing British film in the United States at the time. Based on its US gross, it was the most successful film of the year on a cost to US gross basis. It grossed a total of $71 million worldwide.

== Awards and nominations ==
The Crying Game was nominated for six Academy Awards, including Best Picture, Best Film Editing, Best Actor (Rea), Best Supporting Actor (Davidson) and Best Director. Writer-director Jordan won the Academy Award for Best Original Screenplay. The film also won a BAFTA Award for Outstanding British Film of the Year.

== Soundtrack ==
The soundtrack to the film, The Crying Game: Original Motion Picture Soundtrack, was released in 1993. Boy George scored a comeback hit with his recording of the title song, which peaked at no. 22 in the United Kingdom and no. 15 on the US Billboard Hot 100. The single went to number one in Canada and Iceland too. The song had been released in 1964 by singer Dave Berry. The soundtrack's rendition of Tammy Wynette's "Stand by Your Man" was performed by American singer Lyle Lovett.

Professional ratings
Review scores
Source	Rating
Los Angeles Times	2.5/4 stars
The Philadelphia Inquirer	3/4 stars

1. "The Crying Game" – Boy George
2. "When a Man Loves a Woman" – Percy Sledge
3. "Live for Today" (Orchestral) – Cicero and Sylvia Mason-James
4. "Let the Music Play" – Carroll Thompson (credited as Carol Thompson)
5. "White Cliffs of Dover" – The Blue Jays
6. "Live for Today" (Gospel) – David Cicero
7. "The Crying Game" – Dave Berry
8. "Stand by Your Man" – Lyle Lovett
9. "The Soldier's Wife"*
10. "It's in my Nature"*
11. "March to the Execution"*
12. "I'm Thinking of You"*
13. "Dies Irae"*
14. "The Transformation"*
15. "The Assassination"*
16. "The Soldier's Tale"*

*Orchestral tracks composed by Anne Dudley and performed by the Pro Arte Orchestra of London.

== See also ==
- Breakfast on Pluto (2005)
- List of films featuring the Irish Republican Army
- List of transgender characters in film and television
- List of transgender-related topics
- BFI Top 100 British films
