= John Savage (Irish politician) =

Irish politician

Official portrait of John Savage as mayof of Belfast

Sir John Savage (1814 - 1883) was the mayor of Belfast, Ireland in 1872.

Born in 1814 in Glenavy, a town in County Antrim, he was knighted upon becoming mayor of Belfast.

Following a riot in the Summer of 1872 that served as a precursor to the 1886 Belfast Riots, he put forth a proclamation that closed public houses for a week, authorized government forces to disperse any public gatherings, and authorized government forces to enter any buildings where shots had been fired.

Savage eventually removed constabulary forces from the city, citing the "perfectly peaceful condition" that had arisen after hostilities had cooled.

He married a woman named Mary Turtle in 1838, and died in 1883, allegedly committing suicide without reason.

== See also ==
- Lord Mayor of Belfast

Civic offices
Preceded by Phillip Johnston	Mayor of Belfast; 1872	Succeeded by James Henderson
