= Bernard MacLaverty =

Northern Irish writer

- Born: 14 September 1942 (age 83); Belfast, Northern Ireland, United Kingdom
- Education: Holy Family Primary School
- Alma mater: St Malachy's College; Queen's University Belfast
- Occupations: Novelist, playwright, screenwriter, short story writer, librettist
- Writing career
- Language: English
- Notable works: Lamb (1980); Cal (1983), Grace Notes (1997), The Anatomy School (2001), Midwinter Break (2017)
- Website: www.bernardmaclaverty.com

Bernard MacLaverty (born 14 September 1942) is a Northern Irish fiction writer and novelist. His novels include Cal and Grace Notes. He has written five books of short stories.

== Biography ==
MacLaverty was born in no. 73 Atlantic Avenue in the Newington area of north Belfast, Northern Ireland. He was educated at Holy Family Primary School in Newington and then at St Malachy's College. After school, he studied at Queen's University Belfast where he worked as a medical laboratory technician; later he showed Seamus Heaney some poetry he had written, prompting the renowned poet to advise MacLaverty to stick to short stories. He lived in Belfast until 1975, when he moved to Scotland with his wife, Madeline, and four children (Ciara, Claire, John and Jude). He initially lived in Edinburgh and then the island of Islay before settling in the West End of Glasgow.

He was writer-in-residence at the Universities of Aberdeen, Liverpool John Moores, Augsburg and Iowa State. He was the Ireland Fund Artist-in-Residence in the Celtic Studies Department of University of St. Michael's College, a college at University of Toronto, in October 2007.

== Work ==
MacLaverty is the author of five novels and seven short story collections. His first novel Lamb was published in 1980. It is about faith, relationships and love. It was followed by Cal in 1983. This is an examination of love in the midst of violence. Grace Notes, which was published in 1997, was shortlisted for the Booker Prize for Fiction. It is about the conflict between a desire to compose and motherhood. The Anatomy School (2001) is a comedic coming-of-age novel.

He has also written six collections of short stories, the contents of which are mostly in Collected Stories (Cape, 2013).

MacLaverty wrote a screenplay for Cal in 1984, which was picked up for production by Goldcrest Films; Helen Mirren and John Lynch starred in Cal (1984), and Mark Knopfler composed the film soundtrack, also called Cal. The film was entered into the 1984 Cannes Film Festival, where Mirren won the award for Best Actress. It was received well by critics, but lost money in the box office on the order of –£118,000 net profit. He also adapted Lamb for the screen; Liam Neeson and Hugh O'Conor starred in Lamb (1985) and Van Morrison composed the soundtrack.

MacLaverty has written versions of his fiction for other media – radio plays, television plays, screenplays and libretti. In 2003 he wrote and directed a short film Bye-Child (BAFTA-nominated for "Best Short Film") and more recently wrote libretti for Scottish Opera's Five:15 series The King’s Conjecture, with music by Gareth Williams, and The Letter with music by Vitaly Khodosh. For Scottish Opera in 2012, and again with music by Gareth Williams, he wrote The Elephant Angel, an opera for schools, which toured Scotland and Northern Ireland.

== List of published works ==
Novels

- Lamb, Cape / Blackstaff Press (1980)
- Cal, Cape / Blackstaff Press (1983)
- Grace Notes, Cape / Blackstaff Press (1997)
- The Anatomy School, Cape / Blackstaff Press (2001)
- Midwinter Break: A Novel, W. W. Norton & Company (2017)

Short story collections

- Secrets & Other Stories, Blackstaff Press (1977)
- A Time to Dance & Other Stories, Cape / Blackstaff Press (1982)
- The Great Profundo & Other Stories, Cape / Blackstaff Press (1987)
- Walking the Dog & Other Stories, Cape / Blackstaff Press (1994)
- Matters of Life & Death & Other Stories, Cape (2006)
- Collected Stories, Cape (2013)
- Blank Pages and Other Stories, Cape (2021)

== Critical reception ==
There have been several extensive assessments of his work including:

- Rankin Russell, R. (ed.) (2014). About Bernard MacLaverty: New Critical Readings. Bloomsbury Academic. (191 pages)
- Rankin Russell, R. (2009). Bernard MacLaverty. Bucknell University Press, Contemporary Irish Writers Series. (175 pages).

Colm Tobin described Midwinter Break as 'a work of extraordinary emotional precision and sympathy, about coming to terms – to an honest reckoning – with love and the loss of love, with memory and pain...this is a novel of great ambition by an artist at the height of his powers’.

His work has received multiple awards including being nominated for the Booker Prize in 1997 for Grace Notes. His novel Midwinter Break was the winner of the Bord Gáis Novel of the Year in 2017 and was shortlisted for the International Dublin Literary Award. Other awards were the Pharic McLaren Award for the best radio play from Radio Industries of Scotland for 'My Dear Palestrina' and the Jacobs Award for best play from Radio Telefis Eireann for television production 'My Dear Palestrina' in 1981, the London Evening Standard Award for best screenplay for 'Cal' in 1984 and the Bronze medal for screenplay of 'Lamb'; also voted best film by the youth jury and by the ecumenical jury, Lucarno Film Festival in 1987.

== Awards ==
- 1988 - 'Scottish Writer of the Year'
- 2005 - The Lord Provost of Glasgow’s Award for Literature
- 2018 - Hennessy Literary Hall of Fame
- 2018 - Sunday Herald Culture Awards Best Writer Award 2018
- He is a member of Aosdána, the Irish arts academy.

== See also ==
- List of Northern Irish writers
- List of members of Aosdána
- The Dawning
