= Lost Lives =

Book related to the Northern Ireland Troubles

- Author: Brian Feeney; Seamus Kelters; David McKittrick; David McVea; Chris Thornton
- Language: English
- Subject: The Troubles
- Genre: Non-fiction
- Publication date: 1999

Lost Lives: The Stories of the Men, Women and Children who Died as a Result of the Northern Ireland Troubles is a book that details the lives of people that died as a result of The Troubles in Northern Ireland. It was written by Brian Feeney, Seamus Kelters, David McKittrick, David McVea and Chris Thornton and published in 1999. The book was adapted into a film of the same name in 2019.

The book was written by the journalists Seamus Kelters of the BBC, David McKittrick of The Independent, and the Belfast journalists Brian Feeney and Chris Thornton.

== Book ==
The authors researched the book for seven years prior to its publication in 1999. The first edition of the book details the lives of 3,636 people who died as a result of The Troubles from 1966 to 1999. The information detailed includes the "name, date of death, location, profession, religion, age and marital status, together with a brief summary of the circumstances of the particular death".

The book was published by the Scottish publishers Mainstream Publishing of Edinburgh. It was reprinted in 2008. The book was out of print by December 2020, and Chris Thornton said that he and the surviving authors did not wish the book to be reprinted. Thornton said that much more material had become available since the book was published and he and the other authors had hoped to update it but no publishers were interested. Thornton said that he and the other authors were opposed to any potential governmental involvement in the reprinting of the book as it would "leave it open to political influence". The death of co-author Seamus Kelters also affected them emotionally. Thornton said that "It's wonderful that the book is still being recognised as important...But it's in the past".

It was announced in January 2021 that the Public Record Office of Northern Ireland had received an archive relating to the book consisting of "265 folders of mainly newspaper cuttings relating to most of those individuals who died as a result of the conflict".

The word 'murder' is not used in the book, even though it features in quotes and legal charges bought against individuals involved in the deaths that the book chronicles. Co-author David McKittrick said that the book was intended to be as "unemotional and flat as possible".

== Film ==
A film based on the book premiered at the 2019 London Film Festival and was broadcast on BBC One in February 2020. The film features voiceovers from the actors Kenneth Branagh, Roma Downey, Adrian Dunbar, Brendan Gleeson, Ciarán Hinds, Sean McGinley, Liam Neeson, James Nesbitt, Stephen Rea, and Bronagh Waugh. It is 90 minutes in duration. The film features graphic contemporary footage of the Troubles that is juxtaposed against imagery of the natural landscape of Northern Ireland including rivers, waterfalls, and a swan. The lives of 18 people from the book are detailed by voice overs in the film. The deaths chosen for inclusion in the film are broadly representative of the ratio of deaths of Irish republicans, Loyalist paramilitaries and forces of the British state.

The emotive style of the film contrasts with the "deliberately dispassionate" form of the book. The authors approved of the contrasting styles. Co-author David McKittrick described the film as "full of emotion and raw grief. It is very powerful and it came as a shock to me. But it's a decision we wholly approve of. There is no objection whatsoever from us. They have decided to go for the horror and I believe in some of the first screenings of the film, there were actual gasps in the audience".

The film was directed by Michael Hewitt and Dermot Lavery. Hewitt said he felt the actors were not just "lending their voices but giving their voice in support of what the film represents for us" which was "A reminder of the terrible loss, in the hope that we do not repeat the mistakes of our past". Lavery said that the book was "...a riposte, a challenge to all of us, for allowing this terrible loss of life, all this grief and heartache in the place where we lived" and that "You just need to hold the book in your hand and feel the weight of that loss".

The book and the film do not mention peace talks and negotiations that sought to bring a cessation of the conflict. Robert McCrum in his 2000 review of the book for The Guardian wrote that "It is not fiction, though it is full of heartrending stories, any one of which might provide a gifted writer with the bare bones of a shattering novel. It is not biography, though it is full of ordinary people's lives. It is not really journalism, though it has been compiled by four journalists who may, collectively, have just written the book of their career" and that "There is not space to do justice to the scholarly comprehensiveness, the magisterial evenhandedness or the moral integrity of this astonishing book. Now that the Troubles seem to be over, the publication of Lost Lives is perhaps the great monument for which the bloody history of Northern Ireland has been waiting".

=== Reception ===
Mike McCahill in The Guardian wrote that "The variation of voices staves off any monotony inherent in the list format, and each story opens up some revealing front. Collectively, they provide a renewed sense of just how widespread and all-consuming the Troubles were, how they caught up combatants and civilians, young and old alike" and that "there are images here that couldn't have been shown on the nightly news, interrupting the detachment instilled in the original prose". The "jolting contrast" of the dialogue and imagery is noted with the "enduring beauty of the Irish landscape" set against "todays gleamingly secure pleasure palaces, built after civil war was replaced by something like peace".
