= The Secret Army =

1970s documentary film about the Provisional IRA

The Secret Army is a 1972 documentary film about the Provisional IRA, made by J. Bowyer Bell and Zwy Aldouby. It is notable for its footage of IRA members (notably Martin McGuinness) and their activities at the height of The Troubles.

Viacom purchased the worldwide distribution rights for the film. The film disappeared after its making, and was not released by Viacom despite having purchased the rights to do so. Viacom told Gildin, the executive producer, that the film was forbidden in the British commonwealth. Bell believed that British intelligence persuaded authorities in the United States to stifle the film, while another theory alleges that escalating violence in Northern Ireland unnerved some U.S. television networks. Gildin also claimed that Bell and Aldouby told him that British intelligence had viewed the film while it was being developed in London.

Its existence was revealed by the BBC in 2019, and clips from it are incorporated in a 2024 BBC documentary about its making, also titled The Secret Army. Irish journalist and author Ed Moloney had access to a print of the movie and uploaded the full movie to his website The Broken Elbow in April 2024, about a month after the release of the BBC's documentary about the original 1972 one.

The documentary was presented by the journalist Darragh MacIntyre.

== See also ==
- At the Edge of the Union
