= John Furley =

English humanitarian (1836–1919)

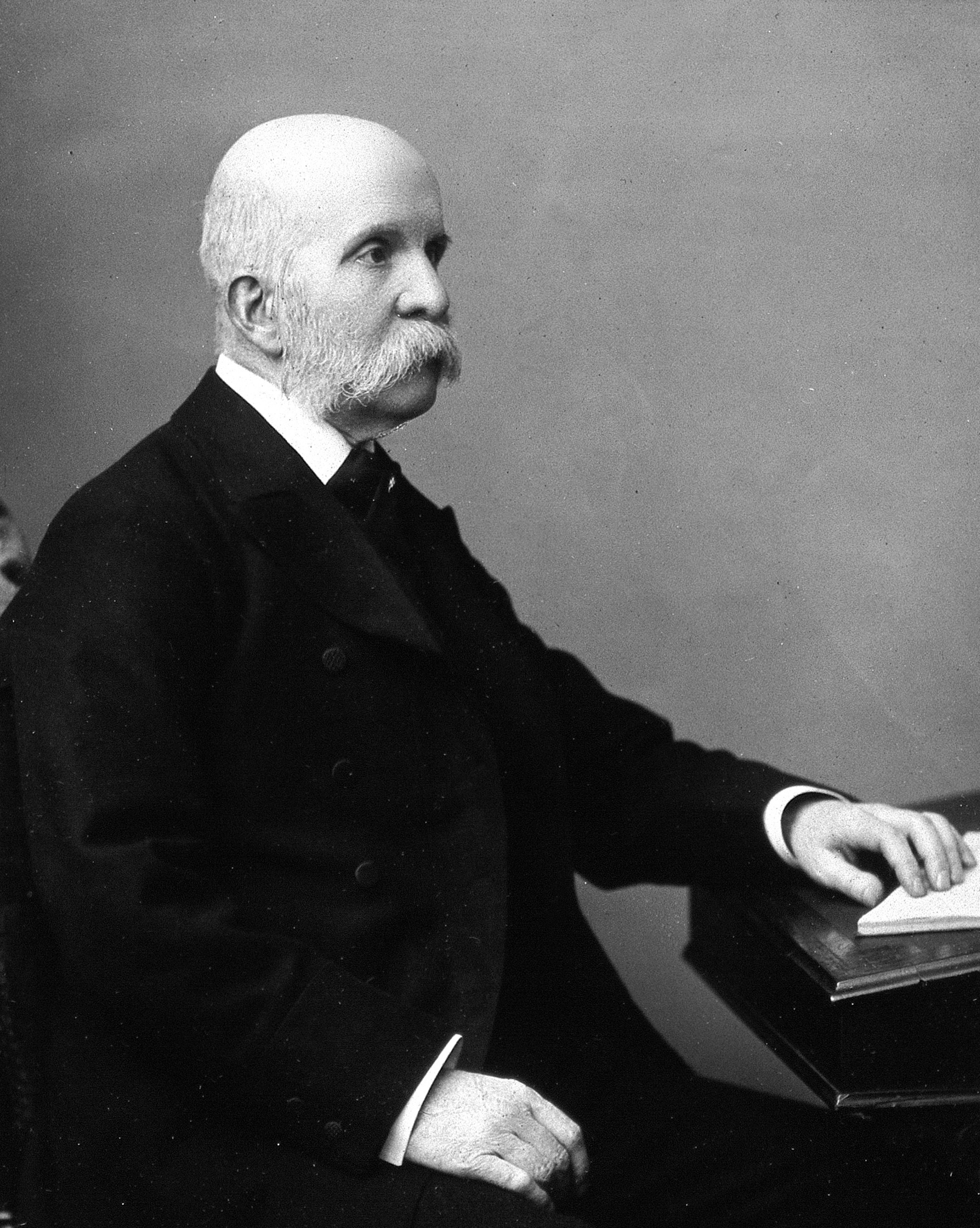
John Furley

Sir John Furley, CH, CB (19 March 1836, in Ashford, Kent – 27 September 1919, in Oxford) was an English humanitarian who worked to improve medical care both in wartime and at home. He was an active member of the Red Cross from its foundation, and one of the founders of St John Ambulance Association, set up to promote first aid training. He travelled to Paris and South Africa to bring humanitarian supplies, and also produced various inventions to help the wounded, including some types of stretcher. He received a knighthood and Order of the Companions of Honour for his charitable works.

== Background and early life ==
His father was Robert Furley, a Justice of the Peace, solicitor and historian. He was born 19 March 1836 in what is now the Masonic Lodge in North Street, Ashford, Kent. He was educated at Harrow. He qualified as a solicitor.

== Charitable work ==
Furley was interested in healthcare and was one of the founders and Honorary Secretary and manager of a cottage hospital in Ashford, Kent. In the 1860s following the Crimean War he was involved in the formation of the International Red Cross. In 1871, following the Franco-Prussian War he travelled to Paris as commissioner of the British National Committee of the Red Cross to bring relief to the victims of the war.

Inspired by the many injuries sustained by workers in British industry, he helped found St John Ambulance Association in 1877, with the intention of training people to administer first aid in the workplace and elsewhere. The organisation arose out of the Order of St. John, a charitable body of vague aims claiming descent from the medieval Knights Hospitaller. Furley worked along with Sir William Montagu, 7th Duke of Manchester, Sir Edmund Lechmere, Bt, and Colonel Francis Duncan to transform this chivalric institution into a modern first-aid organisation. Furley became its first Director of Stores, and worked to improve the design of ambulance trains, horse-drawn ambulance carriages and hospital ships.

He invented the Furley stretcher for carrying wounded people, and the Ashford Litter, which was basically a stretcher with wheels and a canvas cover.

Following the outbreak of the Second Boer War in 1899, he was involved with St John Ambulance and the Central British Red Cross Committee in supervising the supply of ambulance equipment to Africa, serving as commissioner in South Africa for a time. Despite his advanced age, he designed and then commanded a hospital train which was sent to South Africa.

== Honours ==
Furley was knighted in 1899. He was appointed a Companion of the Order of the Bath in the October 1902 South African Honours list, for his service during the recently ended Second Boer War. He became a member of the Order of the Companions of Honour in 1918. He was an Honorary Bailiff of the Order of the Hospital of Saint John of Jerusalem, and in 1902 received the Order of Vasa, Second class, from the King of Sweden. On 29 March 1901, he was appointed a deputy lieutenant of Kent.

== Family ==
Furley married, in 1874, Maria Turner Baker, daughter of George Baker, of Reigate. Maria, Lady Furley was a Lady of Justice of the Order of Saint John of Jerusalem, and involved in nursing alongside her husband. She was mentioned in despatches (29 November 1900) by Lord Roberts, Commander-in-Chief, for civilian service during the early part of the Second Boer War, and received the military decoration Royal Red Cross (RRC) for her service on 6 March 1903.
