= Cal (1984 film) =

- Theatrical release poster
- Directed by: Pat O'Connor
- Screenplay by: Bernard MacLaverty
- Based on: Cal by Bernard MacLaverty
- Produced by: Terence A. Clegg; David Puttnam
- Starring: Helen Mirren; John Lynch; Donal McCann; John Kavanagh; Ray McAnally
- Cinematography: Jerzy Zielinski
- Edited by: Michael Bradsell
- Music by: Mark Knopfler
- Production company: Goldcrest Films
- Distributed by: Columbia-EMI-Warner Distributors
- Release dates: 24 August 1984 (USA); 5 October 1984 (Ireland)
- Running time: 102 minutes
- Country: Ireland
- Language: English
- Budget: £1,930,000

Cal is a 1984 Irish drama film directed by Pat O'Connor and starring John Lynch and Helen Mirren. Based on the 1983 novella of the same name by Bernard MacLaverty, who also wrote the script, the film was entered into the 1984 Cannes Film Festival, where Mirren won the award for Best Actress. Most of the movie was filmed in Drogheda in locations around the town, including Barrack Street and St. Finian's Park.

== Plot ==
Cal is a young member of the Provisional Irish Republican Army (IRA) in 1970s Northern Ireland. He acts as a driver on a nighttime murder of a member of the Royal Ulster Constabulary (RUC), which takes place at the victim's home in view of his father, who is also shot.

One year later, Cal learns that a librarian, Marcella, to whom he is attracted, is a Catholic and the widow of the victim. Cal wants to leave the IRA, but is pressured to remain. He and his father live in the city, where they feel threatened by Orange Order marches and are harassed by Loyalist gangs. Cal is offered work in Marcella's Protestant husband's family farm, where she lives. Initially he works as a hand and, after he and his father are burned out, moves to a semi-derelict cottage on the farm, without telling the IRA his new location.

Marcella is unhappy, feeling suffocated by her domineering mother-in-law and sick father-in-law. Marcella confesses that her marriage was not a happy one. Over time, Cal and Marcella begin a love affair—with Marcella unaware of Cal's role in her husband's death.

While Christmas shopping for Marcella and her child, he is abducted by the IRA, who are unwilling for him to leave them. The car is stopped at a British Army checkpoint and tries to get away. In the ensuing crash, Cal escapes and makes his way to Marcella's home, where he declares his love for her and hints at his involvement in her husband's murder. He has been pursued to the house by the RUC and is arrested and taken away.

== Cast ==
- Helen Mirren as Marcella
- John Lynch as Cal
- Donal McCann as Shamie, Cal's father
- Ray McAnally as Cyril Dunlop
- John Kavanagh as Skeffington
- Stevan Rimkus as Crilly
- Catherine Gibson as Mrs Morton
- Louis Rolston as Dermot Ryan
- Tom Hickey as Preacher
- Gerard Mannix Flynn as Arty
- Seamus Forde as Mr Morton
- Edward Byrne as Skeffington Sr
- J. J. Murphy as Man in Library
- Audrey Johnson as Lucy
- Brian Munn as Robert Morton

== Production ==
Finance came from Goldcrest Films.

== Reception ==
The aggregate review website Rotten Tomatoes has recorded 91% positive response based on 11 reviews.

Goldcrest Films invested £396,000 in the film and received £278,000 in return. They lost £118,000.

== See also ==
- Cal (soundtrack)
