= David McKittrick =

British journalist (1949–2026)

David McKittrick (10 August 1949 – November 2026) was a journalist and author from Belfast who reported on Northern Ireland from 1971, covering the Troubles and the peace process that led to the Good Friday Agreement. He was Ireland correspondent of The Independent from 1986, having previously worked for The Irish Times and BBC Northern Ireland, and also wrote for The Economist.

McKittrick was a co-author of Lost Lives (1999), which recorded every person killed as a result of the Troubles, and of Making Sense of the Troubles (2000, with David McVea). His awards included the Orwell Prize for journalism (2000) and the Christopher Ewart-Biggs Memorial Prize (1989 and 2001).

== Professional career ==
McKittrick began his career as a reporter for the East Antrim Times. He joined the Irish Times in 1973 as a reporter in Belfast, becoming Northern editor in 1976 and London editor in 1981. He worked briefly for BBC Northern Ireland between 1985 and 1986, before joining The Independent. He has since worked as the paper's Irish correspondent.

Widely recognised for the scope of his knowledge and the balance of his reporting on Northern Ireland, he contributed to overseas newspapers and journals. His many awards include the Christopher Ewart-Biggs Memorial Prize for the promotion of peace and understanding in Northern Ireland, 1989 and 2001; Correspondent of the Year, 1999; and the 2000 Orwell Prize for Journalism.

His book Lost Lives was made into a 2019 documentary by Michael Hewitt and Diarmuid Lavery.

== Selected works ==
- Endgame in Ireland (1994),
- The Fight for Peace (with Éamon Mallie, 1994),
- Lost Lives (with Séamus Kelters, Brian Feeney and Chris Thornton, 1999),
- Making Sense of the Troubles (with David McVea, 2000).

== See also ==
- History of Northern Ireland
- List of Northern Irish writers
