= Grace Notes =

1997 book by Bernard MacLaverty

- First edition (publ. Jonathan Cape)
- Author: Bernard MacLaverty
- Publisher: Norton
- Publication date: September 8, 1997
- ISBN: 0-393-04542-0

Grace Notes is a novel by Bernard MacLaverty, first published in 1997. It was shortlisted for the Booker Prize for Fiction, among other honors.

== Plot summary ==
The book centers around the postpartum depression of its female protagonist, Catherine McKenna, a Northern Irish music teacher and composer living in Scotland. She faces preparations for her father's funeral, endures disturbing visions regarding her recently born daughter, Anna, and suffers restrictions imposed by the Catholic Church on her family and her childhood. She engages her depression through the cathartic and intuitive composition of music; later in the book, she begins to craft a master symphony. The novel ends with a powerful live radio broadcast of her symphony.

The title is an explicit reference to grace notes, which a character in the novel terms as "the notes between the notes". The redeeming power of art is indeed a prominent theme. In addition, critics have considered the concept of fleeting and minute musical notes as descriptive of the novel's style.

== Critical response ==
Kirkus Reviews viewed the novel as a "lyrical novel" that ambitiously attempts to speak about "the interior life of an artist struggling to balance the urgent demands of creating music and the equally pressing demands of life." The critic(s) praised the complexity of Catherine's character, while also balancing this with an acknowledgement that this overall did "overshadow everyone else in a novel guided less by 'story' than by musical tides and perturbations;" they also noted that "MacLaverty's mildly impressionistic approach [results in the] slow, even anticlimactic pace of some scenes."

The reviewer for The Washington Post, Ambrose Clancy, found the excessive clerical and saintly characterization of Catherine's life and predispositions to be overly persistent, distracting, or frustrating. Even though a "subtle, naturalistic stylist, MacLaverty is anything but deft in proclaiming Catherine heaven-bound without sin. The novel is saturated with, practically drowned in, religious images and emotions." The examples they give include descriptions by characters on how music is connected to religion, the history of figures like St. Cecelia and St. Gerard, and the sacred feeling that Catherine experiences when her works are performed in a retrofitted chapel. Clancy admits that he's "a gifted writer, with great control, beautiful rhythms to his prose, and insight," and that the novel has some authentically powerful elements, which "peak with Catherine trying to raise her child, write music, and stay sane... Catherine, like many first-time mothers, is overwhelmed by motherhood." However, "the novelist's art doesn't save this book. Catherine is cloyingly pure, and MacLaverty's sledgehammer notions about art as religion run from the quietly sentimental to the loudly shamanistic."

In The Richmond Review, there was much less emphasis on the religiosity of the book, though an agreement on MacLaverty's capability in writing: "the text is made of bite sized, staccato sentences of short, quiet authority that build brick by brick amidst gloriously naturalistic dialogue; this precision of language avoids all sentimentality." Instead of criticizing the ecclesiastic elements in it, Dickson heralds the "musical metaphors [that] fill [it]", with "tone, texture and form recombining as [Catherine] gets better, rebuilding the links to her past."

== Awards ==
Awards for Grace Notes
Year	Award	Result	Ref.
1997	Booker Prize	Shortlist	
1997	James Tait Black Memorial Prize – Fiction	Shortlist	
1997	Saltire Society Literary Award for Scottish Book of the Year	Winner	
1997	Whitbread Award for Novel	Shortlist	

== External ==
- Harte, Liam. Literary Encyclopedia
- The Man Booker Prize 2007
