= Cal (novel) =

1983 novel by Bernard MacLaverty

- First Irish edition (publ. The Blackstaff Press)
- Author: Bernard MacLaverty
- Publisher: Braziller
- Publication date: August 19, 1983

Cal is a 1983 novel by Bernard MacLaverty, detailing the experiences of a young Irish Catholic involved with the Provisional Irish Republican Army.

== Plot summary ==
One of the major themes of the novel is the way in which the title character attempts to come to terms with taking part in the murder of a reserve police officer by his friend Crilly, an operation for which he was the getaway driver, while at the same time trying to fend off the anti-Republican "Orangemen". To make matters worse, Cal finds himself falling in love with the slain man's wife, Marcella.

Cal lacks self-esteem, one source of which is the death of his mother, who held him in high regard; following her death, Cal seems to be only capable of thinking of himself in a bad light. Another factor adding to Cal's initial unhappiness is being a Catholic on a mainly Protestant estate and being part of the minority in Northern Ireland.

He is afraid of Crilly, his friend from school who is a bully, who works for the IRA and uses Cal as a driver. Cal chooses not to follow his father's line of work as he cannot stand the smell of the abattoir. This contributes to, in the general opinion, his feeling of weakness and inferiority.

Cal's self-hatred and depression manifest themselves in a number of ways, such as swearing at himself "You big crotte de chien", hatred of his name, even a hatred of his own reflection. When seeing Marcella with her daughter Lucy, he feels this self-loathing again, believing that this bond between mother and daughter is a "pure love" that he is not worthy of intruding upon, or even observing.

Cal's self-hatred is intensified by his feelings of guilt, even sickness, at the part he played in the murder, describing it as "a brand stamped in blood in the middle of his forehead which would take him the rest of his life to purge". As his love for Marcella grows, so too does his guilt. From this he develops a sense of acceptance at his arrest and brutal treatment, grateful that at last someone is going to beat him "within an inch of his life”, giving him the ability to feel able to repent and allowing the mental anguish within to be transformed into a physical act that he can more readily deal with.

== Film adaptation ==
In 1983, the novel was adapted into a film starring John Lynch and Helen Mirren.

== See also ==
- List of books about the Troubles
