= Otto Jaffe =

German-born British businessman and mayor

Sir Otto Jaffe JP
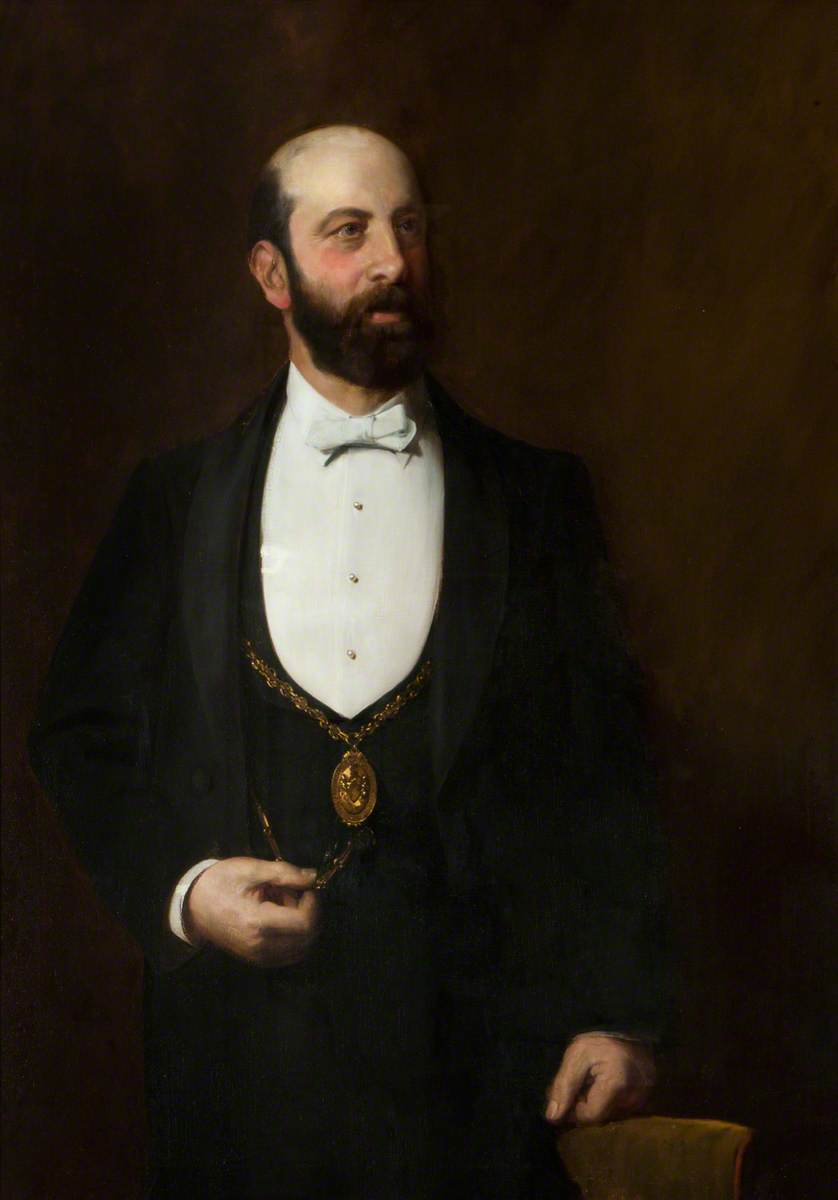
- Portrait by John Haynes-Williams

Lord Mayor of Belfast
- In office 1899–1900
- Preceded by: Sir Anderson Peeler
- Succeeded by: Sir Robert McConnell
- In office 1904–1905
- Preceded by: Sir Daniel Dixon
- Succeeded by: Sir Daniel Dixon

High Sheriff of Belfast
- In office 1901–1902
- Preceded by: Sir James Henderson
- Succeeded by: Samuel Lawther

Member of Belfast City Council
- In office 1894–1916

Personal details
- Born: Otto Moses Jaffe; 13 August 1846 Hamburg, Germany
- Died: 29 April 1929 (aged 82) London, England
- Party: Irish Unionist Party
- Profession: Businessman

Sir Otto Moses Jaffe, JP (13 August 1846 – 29 April 1929), also spelt Jaffé, was a German-born British businessman, who was twice elected Lord Mayor of Belfast and was a leader of the Jewish community in the city.

== Family ==
Jaffe was born in Hamburg on 13 August 1846, the third son of Daniel Joseph and Frederiké Jaffe. In 1852, his parents brought their family to Belfast. Daniel Jaffe along with his older sons, Martin, John and Alfred, set up a business exporting linen. Otto was educated at Mr Tate's school in Holywood, County Down, and later in Hamburg and Switzerland.

== Marriage ==
Otto Jaffe married Paula Hertz, daughter of Moritz Hertz from Braunschweig on 8 March 1879. They had two sons, Arthur Daniel and William Edward Berthold Jaffe.

== Commerce ==
From 1867 to 1877 he lived and worked in New York. In 1877, his brothers retired, so he returned to Belfast to head the family business, "The Jaffe Brothers" at Bedford Street. He built it up to become the largest linen exporter in Ireland. He was a member of the Belfast Harbour Commission. He became a naturalised British subject in 1888. This same year he also de-naturalised as a German citizen In 1894, he successfully agitated for the reporting and destruction of derelicts in the North Atlantic Ocean.

He was a Justice of the Peace, a governor of the Royal Hospital, a member of the Irish Technical Education Board and a member of the Senate of Queen's College, which later became Queen's University of Belfast. He was the German consul in Belfast. He was an active member of the committee which got the Public Libraries Act extended to Belfast, leading to the first free library being established there. In 1910 he erected the Jaffe Spinning Mill on the Newtownards Road, also known as Strand Spinning. This provided work for 350 people, rising to 650 in 1914 when the company expanded to make munitions. He was lavishly charitable and contributed to Queen's College, now Queen's University Belfast.

== Religion ==
Otto Jaffe took a keen interest in the Jewish community of Belfast. He was life-president of the Belfast Hebrew Congregation, which worshipped at the Great Victoria Street synagogue. His father established it in 1871. Between 1871 and 1903 this congregation increased from fifty-five to over a thousand. He paid most of the £4,000 cost of building the synagogue in Annesley Street. He opened it, in 1904, wearing his mayoral regalia. Three years later with his wife, Paula, they set up the Jaffe Public Elementary School on the Cliftonville Road (where, for two years, Maxim Litvinov, the future Soviet foreign minister, taught languages).

== Politics ==
In 1888 Otto Jaffe had been naturalised as a British citizen and denaturalised as a German citizen. He was a member of the Irish Unionist Party. He represented St Anne's Ward for the Belfast Corporation in 1894 and was elected Lord Mayor of Belfast in 1899. As mayor, he launched an appeal for the dependants of soldiers fighting in the Boer War, £10,000 was raised. On 5 March 1900, he was knighted at Dublin Castle by Lord Cadogan, Lord Lieutenant of Ireland. In 1901 he was High Sheriff of Belfast, and in 1904 he was again elected Lord Mayor.

The outbreak of war saw anti-German sentiment and when the RMS Lusitania passenger liner was torpedoed by a German submarine of the coast of County Cork on 7 May 1915, resulting in the death of 1,000 people, anti-German feeling in Britain and Ireland rose to breaking point. Even though he was loyal to the Crown, and his eldest son Arthur and his nephew were serving in the British Army, Sir Otto was accused of being a German spy. Society women refused support for the Children's Hospital so long as Jaffe and his wife remained on the board.

In a letter to the Northern Whig newspaper in May 1915, Sir Otto stated:

"how anyone who has any knowledge of me and my life would think that I could approve of the horrible and detestable actions of which she (Germany) has been guilty is almost beyond my comprehension.

He also described himself as being "overwhelmed with pain and sorrow".

After twenty-five years of service, he resigned his post as Alderman of Windsor Ward for Belfast City Council in June 1916 when he was almost 70 years of age and took up residence in London, where he died in April 1929. Lady Jaffe was too ill to attend his funeral, and she died a few months later, in August 1929.

== Memorial ==
On 21 January 1874 Otto's father, Daniel Joseph Jaffe, died in Nice. Martin Jaffe (Otto's elder brother) secured a plot in the City Cemetery, which became the Jewish Cemetery. To commemorate his father Otto also had a Jaffe Memorial Fountain erected in Victoria Square. In 1933 it was moved to the Botanic Gardens, but in 2008 was restored and returned close to its original site in Victoria Square opposite the Old Town Hall. There is also a blue plaque on the side of the Ten Square Hotel at the top of Linenhall Street in Belfast, placed there by the Ulster History Circle marking where his office was located.

== Arms ==
Coat of arms of Otto Jaffe

Notes
Granted 14 December 1900 by Sir Arthur Edward Vicars, Ulster King of Arms
Crest
On a wreath of the colours an eagle displayed with wings inverted between two oak branches all Proper.
Escutcheon
Argent a chevron Azure between in chief two chaplets and in base a ship in full sail on waves of the sea all Proper on a chief Gules the Castle of Hamburg of the first between two lions passant Or.
Motto
Deus Nobiscum

== See also ==
- History of the Jews in Ireland
- History of the Jews in the United Kingdom

== Sources ==
- Byrne, Art & McMahon, Sean (1991). Great Northerners, Poolbeg Press, ISBN 1-85371-106-3

Civic offices
Preceded by James Henderson	Lord Mayor of Belfast; 1899–1900	Succeeded by R. J. McConnell
Preceded by James Henderson	High Sheriff of Belfast; 1901–1902	Succeeded by Samuel Lawther
Preceded by Daniel Dixon	Lord Mayor of Belfast; 1904–1905	Succeeded by Daniel Dixon
