= Arthur MacCaig =

American documentary filmmaker

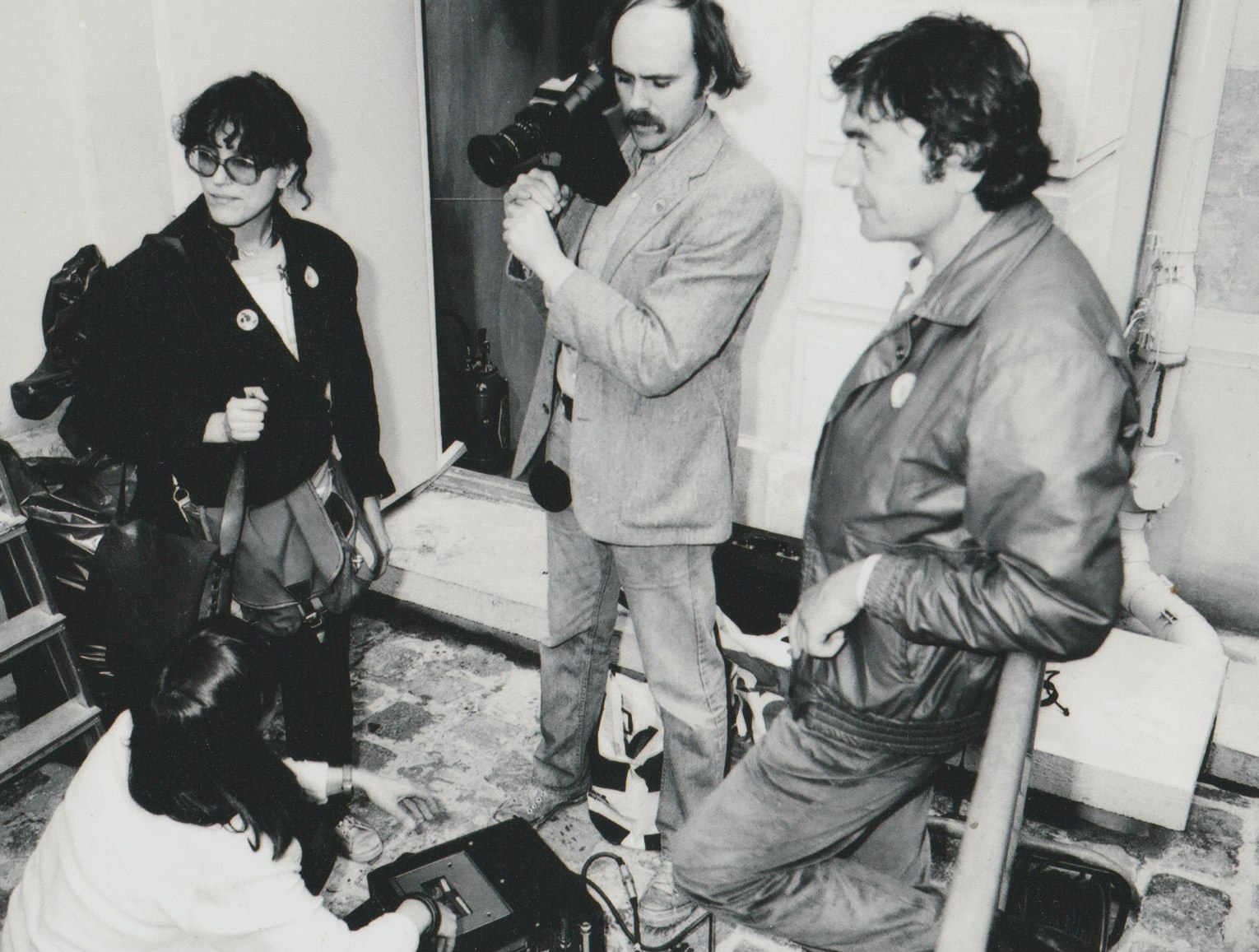
- MacCaig (center) on 10 May 1981, at the headquarters of the Socialist Party.
- Born: June 13, 1949; Weehawken, New Jersey, U.S.
- Died: November 6, 2008 (aged 59); Belfast, Northern Ireland
- Occupations: Filmmaker; producer
- Children: 1

Arthur MacCaig (June 13, 1948 – November 6, 2008) was a United States documentary filmmaker, and founder of the production company, "Dathanna".

== Biography ==
Arthur MacCaig was born in Weehawken, New Jersey, and raised in a working-class neighborhood of North Bergen, New Jersey, on the banks of the Hudson River, into a family of Irish descent. His father, whose family was originally from Belfast, was a dockworker on the Hudson River and a union activist. He was a fervent admirer of the historical figure of James Connolly, a key figure in the Easter Rising of 1916. His mother, whose family was originally from County Cork, was a devout Catholic. His uncle, a former US Marine and FBI agent, also supported the IRA, through his admiration of Michael Collins.

MacCaig attended the University of Hawaiʻi where he received a degree in anthropology in 1971, and a further degree from IDHEC Institut des Hautes Études Cinématrographiques in 1977. He produced several documentary films for the television service of the Organisation for Economic Co-operation and Development in Paris, and went on to found his own independent documentary production company, "Dathanna". His best-known documentary was one of his first creations, The Patriot Game (1979), in which he recounts the history of Northern Ireland since 1922 through interviews and pictures, some clandestine, from the streets. In 1984 he explored the Basque conflict through the documentary Euskadi: Hors d'État (English: Euskadi: the Stateless Nation).

He is the father of Irish documentary filmmaker, Dónal Foreman.

MacCaig died suddenly in 2008 in Northern Ireland.

== Filmography ==
- A Song for Ireland (2005)
- States of Terror (2001)
- War and Peace in Ireland (1998)
- I Am Become Death: They Made the Bomb (1996)
- Voix Irlandaises (12 min - 1994–95)
- State Of Terror (3 x 51 min - 1994)
- Wearing The Green (52 min - 1994)
- Les Années Kalachnikov (4 x 52 min 1991–92)
- Irish Voices (1996)
- Contre Sa Majesté (24 min - 1991)
- Avenue de la Liberté (1990)
- Wearing the Green: Longtermers of the New York State Prison System (1996)
- Irish Ways (52 min - 1989)
- Provos: témoignage d'une guerre (1987)
- Comprendre son Enfant par le Jeu (1987)
- Les Mains Sales (40 min - France 2 1986 - Arthur Mac Caig - Stéphane Gillet)
- The Jackets Green (14 minutes - color Release: 1996)
- Euskadi: Hors d'État (95 min - Dathanna 1984)
- Ammoniac City (35 min - 1982)
- The Patriot Game (93 min - 1979 - Award winner at the Bilbao, Alès and Festkinon Festivals)

== Awards ==
- Cinéma du Réel - nomination, 1979
