= J. Bowyer Bell =

American historian and painter (1931–2003)

- Born: John Bowyer Bell; November 15, 1931; New York City, U.S.
- Died: August 23, 2003 (aged 71); New York City, U.S.
- Education: Washington and Lee University (BA); Duke University (PhD)
- Occupations: Historian; artist; art critic
- Spouses: Charlotte Rockey (m. 1962; died 1981) Nora Browne (m. 1985)
- Children: 4

John Bowyer Bell (November 15, 1931 – August 23, 2003) was an American historian, artist and art critic. He was best known as a terrorism expert.

== Background and early life ==
Bell was born into an Episcopal family in 1931 in New York City. The family later moved to Alabama, from where Bell attended Washington and Lee University in Lexington, Virginia, majoring in history. He also studied art, and discovered he had "total visual memory"—the equivalent of perfect pitch in a singer. His first solo art showing was in the college library in his senior year. He considered becoming a professional artist and made frequent visits to New York to visit other artists, including his hero Franz Kline, but committed to academia. Bell graduated in 1953, and began studying the Spanish Civil War at Duke University in North Carolina. Bell interrupted his studies at Duke after being awarded a Fulbright, and travelled to Italy to study at the University of Rome. Bell travelled Europe interviewing veterans of the Spanish Civil War, and in Rome he mixed with writers and artists including Cy Twombly. After returning to America, Bell completed his doctorate at Duke in 1958.

== Professional career ==
After graduating, Bell began teaching at the Massachusetts Institute of Technology, Harvard University and Trinity School in Manhattan. In 1962, he married Charlotte Rockey, an Egyptologist, and they moved into an apartment in Manhattan. In New York, Bell socialised with the likes of Robert Rauschenberg, Jasper Johns, Jack Kerouac and Frank Stella at the Cedar Tavern. Bell exhibited his paintings and collages at the Allan Stone Gallery, and collected paintings and sculptures by artists including John Chamberlain. Bell was fascinated by global terrorism conflicts and decided to "write [his] way back into academia".

While researching the Middle East, he discovered that the Irgun drew inspiration from the Irish Republican Army (IRA) and the Irish War of Independence, and began to study the IRA. Bell and his family travelled to County Carlow in the Republic of Ireland in 1965, where he spent several months researching the Republican Movement. He discovered little had been published on Irish history after 1922, and the state archives were closed until the 1980s. He began research in the National Library of Ireland, and also interviewed Irish republicans in a Kilkenny public house and hotels in Dublin.

In 1966, his first book was published; Besieged: Seven Cities Under Siege. That same year he returned to Dublin with his family to continue his research. In 1967, he made his first visit to Northern Ireland where he attended a meeting of the banned Republican Clubs. In 1969, he published his second book on the Middle East; The Long War: Israel and the Arabs since 1946. The Troubles began in Northern Ireland in 1969, and Bell's The Secret Army: the IRA 1916–1970 was published the following year, and was one of the first detailed histories of the IRA, along with The IRA by Tim Pat Coogan, which was also published in 1970. After the publication of The Secret Army Bell lived mostly in New York and London and continued to visit Ireland annually. While researching in Ireland, Bell was tear gassed and shot at during riots in Belfast, which he described as "field work a bit too near the centre of the field". Bell continued to travel extensively, researching in the Middle East, Africa, Europe and Asia as part of a career described as "talking to terrorists, gunmen, mad dogs and mercenaries". He was held hostage in Jordan, shot at in Lebanon, kidnapped in Yemen and deported from Kenya. Horn of Africa: Strategic Magnet in the Seventies was published in 1973. In 1974, he began writing with the "Insight Team" of The Sunday Times about the war in Cyprus. This was followed by the 1976 publication of On Revolt: Strategies of National Liberation, for which he interviewed over a hundred participants from revolts against the British Empire. Terror Out of Zion, published in 1977, covered the Irgun and Lehi's guerrilla campaign in the British Mandate of Palestine. Following the death of his first wife in 1981, Bell married an Irishwoman, Norah Browne from County Kerry, whom he had met while filming his 1972 documentary, The Secret Army.

He continued to work in other areas; he was an adjunct professor at Columbia University's School of International and Public Affairs, and he held the position of research associate at the university's Institute of War and Peace Studies. He was a member of the Council on Foreign Relations and founded a consultancy, the International Analysis Centre, whose clients included the United States Department of State, the United States Department of Justice, the Central Intelligence Agency and American television networks. He continued to work as an independent scholar, carrying out research with the aid of grants; he received over seven Guggenheim Fellowships and turned down a Rockefeller Humanities Award. Bell also continued his career in painting, receiving a Pollock-Krasner Fellowship and exhibiting work inspired by the conflicts he witnessed. From 1979 onward, his paintings were exhibited annually at the Taylor Gallery in Dublin, and he also held exhibitions in Manhattan and Hungary. Bell launched a career as an art critic in the 1990s, writing for New York-based journal Review, and he was also commissioned to write catalogue entries for galleries and museum retrospectives.

External videos
- Booknotes interview with Bell on The Irish Troubles: A Generation of Violence, 1967-1992, June 6, 1993, C-SPAN

Bell continued writing about the IRA and the ongoing events of the Troubles in Northern Ireland, and in 1994 he was a speaker at West Belfast Festival, where he suggested the IRA was the only organisation in Northern Ireland that understood its problems. In 1996, he made headlines in Ireland and abroad after meeting with the Army Council of the dissident republican splinter group Continuity IRA at a secret rural location in Ireland. Former IRA member Anthony McIntyre claimed Bell had a pro-Irish republican bias, with McIntyre stating "Bowyer Bell's long familiarity with Irish Republicanism once prompted the caustic comment that there are none more vindictive than a reformed gunman". As well as releasing updated versions of The Secret Army, Bell continued to write about other aspects of the conflicts in Ireland and the Middle East. Cheating and Deception was published in 1991, The Irish Troubles: A Generation of Violence 1967–1992 in 1993, In Dubious Battle: The Dublin and Monaghan Bombings 1972–1974 and Back to the Future: The Protestants and a United Ireland in 1996, and Dynamics of the Armed Struggle in 1998. With the aid of a grant from the Massachusetts Institute of Technology, Bell returned to the Middle East in 2000 to conduct research for his next book, on Egyptian Islamic terrorism. As with The Secret Army first being published shortly after the start of the Troubles, Bell's timing was again good with Murders on the Nile: The World Trade Center and Global Terrorism being published in 2002, shortly after the September 11, 2001, attacks on the United States by Al-Qaeda.

== Death ==
Bell died from renal failure in a New York hospital on August 23, 2003. His paintings continue to be exhibited since his death.
