= Colm Tobin =

Irish screenwriter and TV producer

- Born: Ardfield, Ireland
- Occupations: Screenwriter, television producer

Colm Tobin is an Irish screenwriter and television producer known for his work on Irish Pictorial Weekly, Langerland.TV, Science Fiction, and Brain Freeze.

== Early life ==
He grew up in Ardfield and spent his youth as a musical performer. During college, he studied law. Although he never practiced as a lawyer, he gained an appreciation for politics from these studies, which would later influence his style of humor.

== Writing and TV Production ==
Since 2006, Tobin has worked with Kite Entertainment, as one of the creators of the animated television series Langerland.TV and the stage production Anglo the Musical. The former is based on the satirical website Langerland.com and airs in ten-minute installments on RTÉ Two. A review in The Herald called the series' animation and humor both "rudimentary". Langerland.TV is aimed at adult audiences. However, Tobin has also worked as a writer on two children's animated series: Science Fiction and Brain Freeze. He helped to create the latter, which Aardman Animations has distributed. Tobin has said that writing for children differs from writing for adults, in that with children, "you have to focus on actually entertaining the audience without resorting to controversy or shock." Tobin has contributed content to the Irish Times

Tobin was one of the first Irish writers to use Twitter to raise his profile. The popularity of his twitter account @colmtobin (where he has made a point of emphasising that he is not Colm Tóibín, the famous Irish author) led to him getting a publishing deal with Penguin Books. His book Surviving Ireland was published in 2015. As of May 2025 his popularity on Twitter has waned considerably.

He lives in Dublin.
