= A Political Cartoon =

1974 satiric short film

- Directed by: James K. Morrow; Joe Adamson
- Written by: James K. Morrow; Joe Adamson
- Produced by: James K. Morrow; Joe Adamson; David E. Stone
- Starring: Alex Krakower; Liam Smith; Marshall Anker; Allen Lieb; George Stapleford; Bob Kingsley; Mel Blanc
- Music by: Harry Buch
- Production company: Odradek Productions
- Distributed by: The Creative Film Society
- Release dates: February 20, 1974 (Orson Welles Cinema); October 1, 1974 (United States)
- Running time: 22 minutes
- Country: United States
- Language: English

A Political Cartoon is a 1974 American satiric independent short film produced by James K. Morrow, Joe Adamson and David E. Stone. Combining live-action and animation, the short follows a political campaign manager and a cartoonist who decide to run an animated character for President of the United States. It was distributed by The Creative Film Society.

The short won awards and prizes at many film festivals; it was exhibited at the Orson Welles Cinema, was nominated for a Gold Hugo for Best Short Film at the Chicago International Film Festival, and won the Francis Scott Key Award at the Baltimore Film Festival, the Judge's Prize at the Santa Barbara Film Festival, the Jury's Prize at the Columbus Film Festival, and the Audience Prize at the Midwest Film Festival. In 1996, the short was released on VHS by Kino Video as a part of Cartoongate!, a compilation of politics-themed animated shorts.

== Plot ==
An unemployed cartoonist, Bernie Wibble, and a political activist, Lance Mungo, devise a scheme to embrace the absurdity of modern elections. Lance enlists Bernie's aid in creating a cartoon character named Peter President and running him for President of the United States. After Peter's election, people begin to have negative reactions to cartoons because of him. During a meeting with the Consolidated Commerce Conglomeration, Peter unexpectedly takes a firm stand against them, refusing their offer to use his likeness on their products. The conglomerate responds by sending all the India Ink back to India, rendering him catatonic. Lance and Bernie attempt to revive Peter by transporting ink through a tube, only for the result to turn out unsuccessful. They decide to reuse Bernie's animation of Peter for his next press conference. Later, the CCC hires two 1930s gangsters to kill Bernie. Bernie runs into a printing factory in order to escape them, but ends up getting turned into a comic book, so Lance replaces him with a puppet master.

== Cast ==
- Alex Krakower as Bernie Wibble
- Liam Smith as Lance Mungo
- Marshall Anker as Consolidated Commerce Conglomeration CEO
- Allen Lieb, George Stapleford, and Bob Kingsley as Consolidated Commerce Conglomeration Members
- Mel Blanc as Bugs Bunny
- Joe Adamson (uncredited) as Astronaut, News Reporter, Mailman and Gangster #2 (voice)
- Lindsay Doran (uncredited) as Waitress
- James K. Morrow (uncredited) as Narrator, Bingo, Bongo, Peter President and Cartoon Characters

== Production ==
James K. Morrow, Joe Adamson, and David E. Stone were young filmmakers who collaborated on each other's films (some of which won awards) at Abington High School in Philadelphia, such as It's an Out of its Mind World and The Man Who Owned America. In 1972-1973, the three reunited to create A Political Cartoon under the name "Odradek Productions", which Morrow referred to as "another satiric sally against the American republic". The short was made in the Boston suburbs during Richard Nixon's second inauguration, and stars Alex Krakower, Liam Smith, Marshall Anker, Allen Lieb, George Stapleford, and Bob Kingsley, with Adamson, Morrow, Lindsay Doran, and other crew members portraying additional uncredited roles. Morrow, Adamson and Stone shot principal photography (all the Lance and Bernie scenes and the CCC) and the Panacea commercial at Drew University and in Madison, New Jersey. The living marionette at the end and the press conference were the only scenes shot in Boston environments. The marionette was played by a young girl, with the effect where it manipulates its own strings achieved with the use of a giant pinewood chair. Other pickups such as aerial image animation were done in New York City and in State College, Pennsylvania. The scenes with the 1930s gangsters were achieved using a black-and-white reversal original, a scratched dupe negative, a positive copy with dust on the A-and-B rolls, a filtered voice track (with Adamson dubbing the second gangster's voice), and a hissing crackle supplied by an old 78 record.

Peter President and the other cartoon characters were designed and animated by Stone. The astronauts were stop motion models filmed against a blue screen in a video transmission. The short features two cameo appearances from Bugs Bunny; one at the beginning where he campaigns on behalf of equal rights for cartoon characters everywhere, and another in which he is interviewed at a pet store, where he is on sale as an "Easter Rabbit". The scenes were animated by Mark Kausler, with the cels inked by Manon Washburn. He was only paid around $400.00 for the work. Kausler received criticism on his animation of Bugs from Looney Tunes directors Chuck Jones and Robert McKimson, even though he used an old McKimson model sheet. He would later work on official Looney Tunes media, including Bugs Bunny's Looney Christmas Tales, 9Lives commercials featuring Sylvester the Cat, a Hershey's commercial featuring Wile E. Coyote and Road Runner, The Night of the Living Duck, Daffy Duck's Quackbusters, Bugs Bunny's Wild World of Sports, Box-Office Bunny, and Looney Tunes: Back in Action. The original version of the script had Bugs as an old rabbit at a retirement home for cartoon characters, similar to Jebediah Leland in Citizen Kane. At one point Bugs would ask for a couple of carrots and for them to be wrapped up to look like cigars. However, Warner Bros. did not want Bugs to be shown as old, so a new scene was written where Bugs was painting Easter eggs in the Bugs Bunny Easter Egg Factory. Warner Bros. was finally agreeable to this scene, but Kausler objected and refused to animate it. The scenes in which Bugs campaigns on behalf of equal rights for cartoon characters and is interviewed at the pet store were written and submitted to Warner Bros., and were included in the final version of the film. Mel Blanc recorded the voice while in hospital with a broken leg.

At one point during production, Stone and Adamson were in the editing room when the time came to cut the sound effects track for the scene where Lance and Bernie improvise an ink transfusion for Peter. Stone came up with the idea to use existing sound from outtakes, adding that to the sync production sound.
