= Spin Control =

Spin Control may refer to:

- Spin Control - see Spin (public relations) and Political spin.
- Spin Control (Apple Developer Tools) a performance tool used for monitoring hang activity in software programs
- Spin Control (novel) by Chris Moriarty
