= Chris Moriarty =

American writer (born 1968)

- Born: 1968 (age 57–58)
- Occupation: Writer
- Writing career
- Genres: Science fiction, Fantasy
- Notable work: Spin novel series
- Website: chrismoriarty.net

Chris Moriarty (born 1968) is an American science fiction and fantasy writer.

She has lived in the U.S., Europe, Mexico and Southeast Asia. Before becoming a science fiction writer, she worked as a horse trainer, ranch hand, tourism industry employee, guide and environmental lawyer. She lives in Ithaca, New York.

Moriarty is the author of a trilogy of hard science fiction novels set in a distant future where Earth has undergone ecological collapse. Most of humanity has migrated to various planets and space habitats, both in the Solar System and around nearby stars such as Barnard's Star and 51 Pegasi. The technologies feature cloning, artificial intelligences, genetic constructs and use of a material referred to as "condensate" which allows instantaneous communication and teleportation. The trilogy has garnered significant critical acclaim, including nominations for the Philip K. Dick, John Campbell, Spectrum, Prometheus, and Lambda Awards. Spin Control won the 2007 Philip K. Dick Award.

Moriarty is also the author of two young adult fantasy novels, The Inquisitor's Apprentice and The Watcher in the Shadows. Her young adult novels feature a Jewish main character and take place on the Lower East Side in an alternate Gilded Age New York. The Inquisitor's Apprentice was one of Library Journal's Top Ten Children's Books of 2011. Both The Inquisitor's Apprentice and The Watcher in the Shadows have been book club selections for PJ Library's program to promote outstanding Jewish children's literature.

== Bibliography ==
=== Novels ===
Spin series

- Spin State (2003) Bantam Spectra
- Spin Control (2006) Bantam Spectra
- Ghost Spin (2013) Bantam Spectra

The Inquisitor's Apprentice series

- The Inquisitor's Apprentice (2011) Houghton Mifflin Harcourt
- The Watcher in the Shadows (2013) Houghton Mifflin Harcourt

=== Book reviews ===
Year	Review article	Work(s) reviewed
2010	Moriarty, Chris (January–February 2010). "Books". F&SF. 118 (1&2): 37–44. Archived from the original on January 21, 2010.	Morrow, James (2009). Shambling Towards Hiroshima. Tachyon.; Joyce, Graham (2009). How to make friends with demons. Night Shade Books.; Clarke, Arthur C. & Frederik Pohl (2009). The last theorem. Del Rey.; Bear, Greg (2009). City at the end of time. Del Rey.; Williams, Walter Jon (2009). Implied spaces. Night Shade Books.
