= Wibble =

Wibble may refer to:

- Anne Wibble (1943–2000), Swedish minister of finance
- Wibble, a fictional character in The Tigress (1927 film)
- Bernie Wibble, a fictional character in A Political Cartoon
- Wibble, a cocktail by Dick Bradsell
- Metasyntactic variable, a word identified as a placeholder in computer science
