= Ament =

Ament may refer to:

- Catkin, a cylindrical flower cluster
- Ament (surname)
- Imentet, an ancient Egyptian funerary goddess

== See also ==
- Amenti
