= James K. Morrow =

American author (born 1947)

James Kenneth Morrow
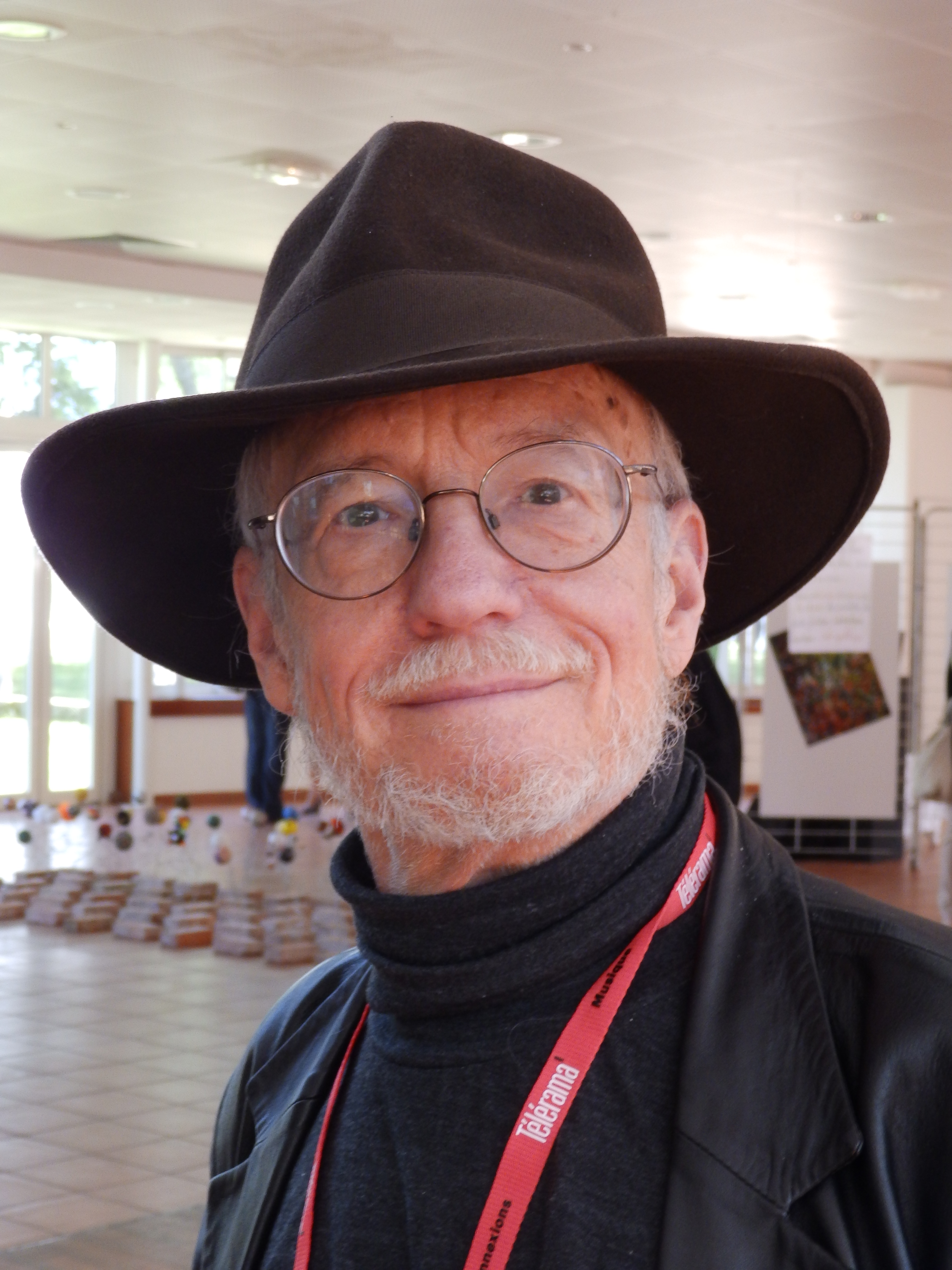
- Morrow in 2016
- Born: March 17, 1947 (age 79); Philadelphia, Pennsylvania, U.S.
- Occupations: Writer, editor
- Relatives: Lance Morrow (cousin)
- Writing career
- Period: 1981–present
- Genres: Science fiction, fantasy, literary fiction
- Notable work: Godhead trilogy
- Movements: Satirist, transrealism, humanism
- Website: www.jamesmorrow.info

James Morrow (born March 17, 1947) is an American novelist and short-story writer known for filtering large philosophical and theological questions through his satiric sensibility.

Most of Morrow's oeuvre has been published as science fiction and fantasy, but he is also the author of two unconventional historical novels, The Last Witchfinder and Galápagos Regained. He variously describes himself as a "scientific humanist," a "bewildered pilgrim," and a "child of the Enlightenment".

Morrow lived in State College, Pennsylvania with his second wife, Kathryn Smith Morrow, and their two dogs. They currently live in Huntingdon, Pennsylvania.

== Early life and education ==
James Kenneth Morrow was born in Germantown, Philadelphia, on March 17, 1947, the only child of Emily Morrow, née Develin, and William Morrow (no relation to the publisher of the same name). During World War II, the U.S. Army exempted Bill Morrow from the draft owing to his employment by the Midvale Steel Works.

After the war, Emily and William bought a small house in the Philadelphia suburb of Roslyn, Pennsylvania, a choice driven largely by the sterling reputation of Abington Township's public-school system. James Morrow attributes his fiction-writing career directly to the humanities curriculum at Abington Senior High School. In particular, his exposure to James Giordano's tenth-grade World Literature class prompted him to imagine himself one day composing novels and stories inspired by the philosophically inclined authors in the syllabus, among them Dante, Voltaire, Dostoyevsky, Kafka, Camus, and Ibsen.

Throughout his adolescence Morrow produced a series of 8 mm genre films with his friends at Abington High School, including Joe Adamson, who ultimately made documentary films in Los Angeles; David E. Stone, who became a Hollywood sound editor; and George Shelps, who remained in the Philadelphia area and became a suburban planner. The output of "Abington-International Movie Company" encompassed adaptations of Edgar Allan Poe's The Tell-Tale Heart, August Derleth and Mark Schorer's "The Return of Andrew Bentley", and Samuel Taylor Coleridge's The Rime of the Ancient Mariner, which received an Honorable Mention in the 1964 Kodak Movie News Teen-Age Movie Contest.

While an undergraduate at the University of Pennsylvania, Morrow met his living expenses by working as a filmmaker for the Philadelphia Public Schools, shooting and editing a series of 16 mm films documenting and celebrating the innovations for which the system was famous in the late 1960s.

Upon receiving his BA degree from Penn in 1969, Morrow moved to Somerville, Massachusetts, so he could attend the Harvard Graduate School of Education (HGSE).

== Pre-fiction career ==
After receiving an MAT from Harvard in 1970, Morrow found work in the Boston area as an instructional media specialist and graphic artist, first in the Newton Public Schools (1971–1973) and then in the Chelmsford Public Schools (1973–1978). Among the curriculum materials he produced during these years were Moviemaking Illustrated: The Comicbook Filmbook (Hayden Book Company, 1973, coauthored with Murray Suid), and Media and Kids: Real World Learning in the Schools (Hayden Book Company, 1977, also coauthored with Murray Suid).

From 1972 to 1973, Morrow reunited with high-school filmmaking friends Adamson and Stone to create a 16 mm satiric short called A Political Cartoon, which tells of a cartoon character who gets elected President of the United States. According to Morrow, the 22-minute film was their second "satiric sally against the American republic", following one of their previous collaborations from the 1960s, The Man Who Owned America. The film also featured two cameo appearances from Warner Bros.' Bugs Bunny. It was distributed by The Creative Film Society in 1994, and exhibited at the Orson Welles Cinema in Cambridge, Massachusetts that same year. In 1996, the film was released on VHS by Kino Video as a part of Cartoongate!, a compilation reel of animated shorts.

In 1972, Morrow married Jean Pierce, a fellow HGSE graduate. They had two children, Kathleen and Christopher. The couple separated in 1995. Morrow married Kathryn Smith—a bookseller, freelance editor, independent scholar, and occasional critic—in 1996.

During the 1980s, Morrow worked as one of the principal writers for the biannual periodical, A Teacher's Guide to NOVA (WGBH Educational Foundation). He also became a regular contributor to TV Guide magazine, writing such commentaries as "TV Didn't Turn Us into Lemmings and Vikings" (October 9, 1982), "Big Brother Isn't Watching—Yet" (January 28, 1984), "We Need a Nightly News Show on the Nuclear Arms Race" (March 8, 1986), and "The Best Way to Watch TV? Noisily and Together" (April 11, 1987).

In 1977, TSR published James Morrow's murder-mystery board game, Suspicion, which he was inspired to create after seeing the 1974 movie adaptation of Murder on the Orient Express. Six years later, Morrow was hired by Circuits and Systems, a New Hampshire firm, to design the graphics and help shape the script for Fortune Builder (1984), a ColecoVision game sometimes regarded as a forerunner to SimCity.

== Fiction career ==
With the publication of his first novel, The Wine of Violence, in 1981, James Morrow embarked on a full-time career as a writer of comedic but philosophically informed fiction, thus fulfilling the pact he'd made with his tenth-grade self to participate in the universe of ideas opened up to him by James Giordano's World Literature class.

Over the course of the next thirty-four years, Morrow produced ten novels, three stand-alone novellas, and several dozen short stories, many of them satirizing conventional Christian arguments about the workings of the universe. Beyond his fascination with religious questions, Morrow's characteristic themes include the folly of war, the necessity of feminism, and the parent-child bond. Ever since high school, his worldview has been essentially secular and atheistic.

On the whole, Morrow's work has been favorably received by critics, both within the science-fiction community and the mainstream literary world. The Last Witchfinder (2006) was praised by both New York Times reviewer Janet Maslin and Washington Post Book World editor Ron Charles.

Early in 2010, on the strength of the Russian translations of his novel Only Begotten Daughter (1990) and collection Bible Stories for Adults (1996), Morrow was invited to participate in the Fifteenth International Tolstoy Conference. After spending a week in Moscow, he and Kathryn traveled to Tolstoy's estate, where the author delivered a paper titled, "Charles Darwin Comes to Yasnaya Polyana," a scholarly thought-experiment spun from Morrow's Galápagos Regained, his novel (then in progress) about the coming of the Darwinian worldview.

Around the time of the Tolstoy Conference, Morrow's dark theological comedy Blameless in Abaddon (1996) came to the attention of Bernard Schweizer, a professor at Long Island University, Brooklyn, who invited the novelist to join him and NYU's Gregory T. Erickson in establishing an organization dedicated to celebrating the heretical, blasphemous, and religiously unorthodox dimensions of literature and art. On May 3, 2013, the International Society for Heresy Studies was inaugurated at the Torch Club of New York University. Beyond Schweizer, Erickson, and Morrow, the founders included philosopher and novelist Rebecca Newberger Goldstein and literary critic and novelist James Wood.

=== Novels ===
Morrow's first two novels were overtly science-fictional in substance and tone. The Wine of Violence (Holt, Rinehart and Winston, 1981) tells of a pacifist utopia whose citizens sublimate their aggressive urges through autobiographical video fantasies. The Continent of Lies (Holt, Rinehart and Winston 1984) posits a futuristic entertainment medium called "dreambeans" or "cephapples": genetically engineered fruits that plunge consumers into scripted hallucinations.

The author next attempted a more immediate, political, and experimental narrative. Although This Is the Way the World Ends (Henry Holt, 1986) was marketed initially as a mainstream novel, the science-fiction community embraced it, giving Morrow his first Nebula Award nomination. The plot is driven by "The Unadmitted," a ghostly race of potential humans who never got to be born, due to nuclear holocaust. Determined to use their earthly tenures wisely, the unadmitted put the surviving architects of Armageddon—including the novel's everyman protagonist—on trial under the Nuremberg precedent.

Only Begotten Daughter (William Morrow 1990) represented the author's initial exploration of the subject that would preoccupy him during his mature writing years: the enigma of religious faith. The protagonist is Julie Katz, whose existential problems include the fact that she is Jesus Christ's divine half-sister, reincarnated in contemporary Atlantic City.

In The Last Witchfinder (William Morrow, 2006) the author dramatized the birth of the scientific worldview. Though much of the novel plays like straightforward, albeit comic, historical fiction, the author employs a peculiar postmodern conceit: the story is told by a sentient book, Isaac Newton's Principia Mathematica. The narrative turns on Jennet Stearne, who makes it her life's mission to bring down the Witchcraft Act 1603.

Morrow wrote his ninth full-length novel, an homage to Mary Shelley's Frankenstein, under the title The Philosopher’s Apprentice (William Morrow, 2008). The protagonist, Mason Ambrose, is a failed philosophy student hired to implant a moral compass in a mysterious young woman, Londa Sabacthani, whose conscience is a blank slate.

Much as The Last Witchfinder celebrates the coming of the Enlightenment, Morrow's tenth novel, Galápagos Regained (St. Martin's Press, 2015), rejoices in the advent of evolutionary thought. The heroine is Charles Darwin's zookeeper, the fictional Chloe Bathurst, who will stop at nothing to win the Great God Contest: £10,000 to the first person who can prove, or disprove, the existence of God.

=== The Godhead Trilogy ===
In the 1990s Morrow devoted most of his writing energy to an ambitious project spun from the premise that God has died, leaving behind a two-mile-long corpse. While each book in the Godhead Trilogy features a different protagonist and an independent plot, certain characters and motifs recur throughout the cycle, as does the Corpus Dei.

In Towing Jehovah (Harcourt Brace, 1994) a disgraced supertanker captain, Anthony Van Horne, is commissioned by the angel Raphael to tow the divine cadaver to its final resting place in the Arctic. As the voyage progresses, atheists and believers alike take pains to keep God's death a secret.

Blameless in Abaddon (Harcourt Brace, 1996), a modern-dress version of the Book of Job, turns on the plight of Martin Candle, a small-town, small-time magistrate who, sorely afflicted with cancer, resolves to drag God before the World Court and prosecute him for his seeming indifference to human suffering. A character modeled on C.S. Lewis agrees to finance the elaborate proceeding, but only if he gets to make the case for the defense.

The Eternal Footman (Harcourt Brace, 1999) begins with the last remnant of the Corpus Dei, God's immense skull, going into geosynchronous orbit above Times Square. This second moon causes a "plague of death awareness" to descend on humankind. Among the victims is a boy whose resourceful mother, Nora Burkhart, undertakes an odyssey from New England to Mexico in an effort to deliver the stricken child from his apparent fate.

=== Notable shorter fiction ===
Morrow's oeuvre includes three stand-alone science-fiction novellas, each reflecting the author's penchant for mixing dire situations with acerbic and absurdist humor.

City of Truth (Random Century Group, UK, 1990) occurs in the world of Veritas, a dystopia of mandatory candor. To save his mortally ill son, the protagonist, Jack Sperry, must somehow transcend his Skinnerian conditioning and learn to tell lies.

Set in the final days of World War Two, Shambling Towards Hiroshima (Tachyon, 2009) describes the U.S. Navy's attempt to leverage a Japanese surrender via a "biological weapon" that anticipates Godzilla.

An homage to early 1950s live television, The Madonna and the Starship (Tachyon, 2014) tells of a New York pulp writer who must convince two hyper-rationalist aliens that a weekly religious program is satiric in intent, for otherwise the invaders will annihilate its audience of two million devout viewers.

Among his better known stories collected in Bible Stories for Adults (Harcourt Brace, 1996) are "Spelling God with the Wrong Blocks" (featuring Darwin-worshiping robots who believe they evolved pursuant to evolutionary principles), "Daughter Earth" (in which a Pennsylvania farmer's wife gives birth to a small planet), and "Arms and the Woman" (in which a canny Helen of Troy attempts to end "the war to make the world safe for war").

The author's second collection, The Cat's Pajamas and Other Stories (Tachyon, 2004) included "Auspicious Eggs" (set in a dystopian Boston where anti-abortion sentiment now encompasses "the rights of the unconceived"), "Martyrs of the Upshot Knothole" (dramatizing the possible connection between John Wayne's cancer and atomic-bomb tests), and "The Zombies of Montrose" (an entry in the author's cycle of one-act plays).

A humorous political satire of the German Expressionistic classic silent film, The Cabinet of Dr. Caligari, The Asylum of Dr. Caligari (Tachyon, 2017) follows a young painter, Francis Wyndham, and Ilona Wessels, a brilliant, semi-insane inmate, who conspire to thwart infamous asylum director Dr. Alessandro Caligari's evil moneymaking scheme (making and then selling the use of a sorcerous painting to incite soldiers into battlelust). Morrow's version of Caligari is a timely, acerbic meditation on the volatile interaction of commerce and politics, and how it can lead to dangerously dramatic scenarios on the world stage.

=== Anthologies and lesson plans ===
Several years after Morrow won a Nebula Award for Best Short Story, the Science Fiction Writers of America assigned him to edit three anthologies: Nebula Awards 26 (Harcourt Brace 1992), Nebula Awards 27 (Harcourt Brace 1993), and Nebula Awards 28 (Harcourt Brace, 1994).

Throughout the first decade of the twenty-first century, James and Kathryn Morrow were regular guests at Utopiales, a literary festival held annually in Nantes. One outcome of their interaction with the international SF community was The SFWA European Hall of Fame (Tor Books, 2007), an anthology of sixteen stories carefully translated into English from thirteen Continental languages, each such rendering the result of a three-way internet conversation among the author, the translator, and the Morrows.

With the release of Peter Jackson's movie adaptations of J.R.R. Tolkien's fantasy novel The Lord of the Rings, Houghton Mifflin hired both James Morrow (on the strength of his published instructional materials) and Kathryn Morrow (given her extensive knowledge of Tolkien's oeuvre) to write a book-length curriculum for middle-school and high-school teachers wishing to bring The Hobbit and The Lord of the Rings into their classrooms. The resulting resource, Tolkien's Middle Earth: Lesson Plans for Secondary School Educators (Houghton Mifflin, 2006), was posted on the publisher's website.

== Honors and awards ==
- CINE Golden Eagle for 16 mm short film, Children of the Morning (1969), filmed at the Institutes for the Achievement of Human Potential, Philadelphia, Pennsylvania.
- A Political Cartoon (1974), a 16 mm short film by Joe Adamson, James Morrow, and David Stone, was nominated for a Gold Hugo for Best Short Film at the Chicago International Film Festival, and won the Francis Scott Key Award at the Baltimore Film Festival, the Judge's Prize at the Santa Barbara Film Festival, the Jury's Prize at the Columbus Film Festival, and the Audience Prize at the Midwest Film Festival.
- Nebula Award for Best Short Story, "Bible Stories for Adults, No. 17: The Deluge" (1988)
- World Fantasy Award for Best Novel, Only Begotten Daughter (1991)
- Nebula Award for Best Novella, City of Truth (1992)
- World Fantasy Award—Novel, Towing Jehovah (1995)
- Grand Prix de l'Imaginaire for Best Novel, Towing Jehovah (1995)
- The Volume 5, Number 12 issue of Paradoxa: Studies in World Literary Genres (1999) was devoted entirely to James Morrow's novels and short stories.
- Guest of Honor at Confluence, Mars, Pennsylvania, 2000
- Guest of Honor at ConQuest 32, Kansas City, Kansas, 2001
- Inducted into Abington Senior High School Hall of Fame, 2002
- Prix Utopia for Lifetime Achievement in Science Fiction (2005)
- Guest of Honor at Readercon 17, Burlington, Massachusetts, 2006
- Theodore Sturgeon Award for Best Short Fiction, Shambling Towards Hiroshima (2010)
- Guest of Honor at ArmadilloCon 37, Austin, Texas, July 2015

== Bibliography ==
=== Novels ===
- The Wine of Violence (1981) – ISBN 978-0030590511
- The Continent of Lies (1984) – ISBN 978-0671559694
- This Is the Way the World Ends (Henry Holt, 1986) – ISBN 978-0030080371
- Only Begotten Daughter (1990) – ISBN 978-0688052843
- The Last Witchfinder (2006) – ISBN 978-0739474655
- The Philosopher's Apprentice (2008) – ISBN 978-0061351457
- Galápagos Regained (2015) – ISBN 978-1250054012
- The Asylum of Dr. Caligari (2017) – ISBN 978-1616962654
- And the Last Trump Shall Sound (with Harry Turtledove and Cat Rambo) (2020) - ISBN 978-1647100056

==== Godhead trilogy ====
- Towing Jehovah (1994) – ISBN 978-0151909193
- Blameless in Abaddon (1996) – ISBN 978-0151886562
- The Eternal Footman (1999) – ISBN 978-0151293254

==== Chapbook format ====
- The Adventures of Smoke Bailey (1983)
- City of Truth (1991) – ISBN 978-0156180429
- Shambling Towards Hiroshima (2009)
- The Madonna and the Starship (2014) – ISBN 978-1616961596
- Bigfoot and the Bodhisattva (2018) – ISBN 978-1616962937

=== Collections ===
- Swatting at the Cosmos (1990) – ISBN 978-1561462582
  - Introduction: Swatting at the Cosmos, essay
  - "The Assemblage of Kristin" (1984), short story
  - "Bible Stories for Adults, No. 17: The Deluge" (1988), short story
  - "The Eye That Never Blinks" (1988), short story
  - "Bible Stories for Adults, No. 20: The Tower" (1990), short story
  - "The Confessions of Ebenezer Scrooge" (1989), short story
  - "Bible Stories for Adults, No. 31: The Covenant (1989), short story
  - "Spelling God with the Wrong Blocks" (1987), short story
- Bible Stories for Adults (1996) – ISBN 978-0151001927
  - Preface (Bible Stories for Adults), essay
  - "Bible Stories for Adults, No. 17: The Deluge" (1988), short story
  - "Daughter Earth" (1991), short story
  - "Known But to God and Wilbur Hines" (1991), short story
  - "Bible Stories for Adults, No. 20: The Tower" (1990), short story
  - "Spelling God with the Wrong Blocks" (1987), short story
  - "The Assemblage of Kristin" (1984), short story
  - "Bible Stories for Adults, No. 31: The Covenant" (1989), short story
  - "Abe Lincoln in McDonald's" (1989), short story
  - "The Confessions of Ebenezer Scrooge" (1989), short story
  - "Bible Stories for Adults No. 46: The Soap Opera" (1994), short fiction
  - "Diary of a Mad Deity" (1988), novelette
  - "Arms and the Woman" (1991), novelette
- The Cat's Pajamas and Other Stories (2004) – ISBN 978-1892391155
  - "The War of the Worldviews" (2002), short story
  - Introduction: Good Morrow to Our Waking Souls, essay by Terry Bisson
  - "The Wisdom of the Skin" (2002), short story
  - "Martyrs of the Upshot Knothole" (2004), short story
  - "Come Back, Dr. Sarcophagus", short story
  - "The Fate of Nations" (2003), short story
  - "The Eye That Never Blinks" (1988), short story
  - "Director's Cut" (1994), short story
  - "Auspicious Eggs" (2000), novelette
  - " Apologue" (2001), short story
  - "Fucking Justice", short story
  - "Isabella of Castile Answers Her Mail" (1992), short story
  - "The Zombies of Montrose", short story
  - "The Cat's Pajamas" (2001), novelette
- Reality by Other Means: The Best Short Fiction of James Morrow (2015) – ISBN 978-0819575944
- Nothing Sacred: Outspoken Voices in Contemporary Fiction (2024) – ISBN 979-8988717300

=== Short fiction ===
Year	Title	First published	Reprinted	Notes
1989?	"Bible Stories for Adults, No. 17: The Deluge"			
1990	City of Truth	City of Truth (Random Century, 1990)		
2009	Shambling Towards Hiroshima	Shambling Towards Hiroshima (Tachyon, 2009)		
2014	The Madonna and the Starship	The Madonna and the Starship (Tachyon, 2014)		
2017	The Asylum of Dr. Caligari	The Asylum of Dr. Caligari (Tachyon, 2017)		
2020	"Bible Stories for Adults, No. 37: The Jawbone"	—— (July–August 2020). "Bible Stories for Adults, No. 37: The Jawbone". F&SF. 139 (1&2): 35–51.		
