= The Continent of Lies =

- Cover of the 1984 Holt, Rinehart and Winston edition
- Author: James K. Morrow
- Language: English
- Publication date: 1984

The Continent of Lies is a 1984 novel written by James K. Morrow.

== Plot summary ==
The Continent of Lies is a novel in which the story centers on the concept of a "cephapple," a fictional vegetable that functions like a pre-programmed dose of LSD, delivering vivid, immersive dream experiences akin to watching a compelling movie. Because users live within these dreams, the creation process is critical. The plot follows a disturbed individual who engineers a terrifying dream and finds someone to cultivate it, prompting the weary Quininn to undertake a mission to locate and destroy the resulting cephapple tree.

== Reception ==
Wendy Graham reviewed The Continent of Lies for Adventurer magazine and stated that "Nice story, a Science Fiction whodunnit really, and well paced, apart from the bits where the good guys are travelling through the tree, which I found a real yawn."

== Reviews ==
- Review by Debbie Notkin (1984) in Locus, #278 March 1984
- Review by Joseph Marchesani (1984) in Fantasy Review, August 1984
- Review by Norman Spinrad (1984) in Isaac Asimov's Science Fiction Magazine, December 1984
- Review by Baird Searles (1985) in Isaac Asimov's Science Fiction Magazine, January 1985
- Review by Thomas A. Easton [as by Tom Easton] (1985) in Analog Science Fiction/Science Fact, January 1985
- Review by Jim England (1985) in Vector 126
- Review by Mary Gentle (1985) in Interzone, Autumn 1985, (1985)
- Review by Don D'Ammassa (1986) in Science Fiction Chronicle, #77 February 1986
- Review [French] by Roland C. Wagner (1987) in Fiction, #383
- Review by Christopher Ogden (1987) in Paperback Inferno, #65
- Review by Elaine Cochrane (1989) in SF Commentary, #67
- Review by Scott Campbell (1992) in SF Commentary, #71/72
