= Tom McCarthy (sound editor) =

American sound editor

- Born: Thomas McCarthy
- Other names: Tom C. McCarthy; Thomas C. McCarthy; Tom McCarthy Jr.
- Occupation: Sound editor
- Years active: 1979-1994

Tom McCarthy is an American sound editor. He won the Academy Award for Best Sound Editing during the 65th Academy Awards. He won for Bram Stoker's Dracula. His Oscar was shared with David Stone.

== Selected filmography ==
- Blankman (1994)
- Lost in Yonkers (1993)
- Poetic Justice (1993)
- Bram Stoker's Dracula (1992)
- Sleepwalkers (1992)
- All I Want for Christmas (1991)
- My Girl (1991)
- Toy Soldiers (1991)
- Arachnophobia (1990)
- Ghostbusters II (1989)
- *batteries not included (1988)
- Adventures in Babysitting (1987)
- The Karate Kid, Part II (1986)
- Heaven's Gate (1980)
