= Only Begotten Daughter =

1990 novel by James K. Morrow

- Cover of first edition (hardcover)
- Author: James K. Morrow
- Language: English
- Genre: Fantasy
- Publisher: William Morrow and Company
- Publication date: 1990
- Publication place: United States
- Media type: Print (Hardcover & paperback)
- Pages: 312
- ISBN: 0-688-05284-3
- OCLC: 20294258
- Dewey Decimal: 813/.54 20
- LC Class: PS3563.O876 O55 1990

Only Begotten Daughter is a 1990 fantasy novel by American writer James K. Morrow, setting the stage for his later Godhead Trilogy. The book shared the 1991 World Fantasy Award with Ellen Kushner's Thomas the Rhymer. It was also nominated for the Nebula Award for Best Novel in 1990, and both the Locus and John W. Campbell Memorial Awards in 1991.

== Plot ==
The story is about Julie Katz, the new Messiah, who is the daughter of God, and who is spontaneously conceived from a sperm bank donation by her father, Murray Katz, through "inverse parthenogenesis". Julie struggles with her messianic powers, the mind games of Satan, being hunted by fundamentalists, and the silence of her mother, God.

This novel is a counter-theodicy similar to Morrow's Godhead Trilogy. In addition, Only Begotten Daughter refers to God as a female throughout the book.

Inverse parthenogenesis is a baffled scientist's explanation for the existence of an entirely unexpected ovum in Murray Katz's latest sperm bank donation: unexpected because, as Murray himself admits, he does not know many women. (The ovum, though, apparently, has been provided the necessary Immaculate Conception.) Murray is a Jewish hermit pushing fifty, living alone in a lighthouse in Atlantic City, writing a book about human nature based on evidence gleaned from a job at the local Photomat. His closest friend is lesbian Georgina Sparks, foster-mother to Julie.

The result of these gathered abnormalities is Julie Katz, half-sister to Jesus. Well-schooled in the appropriate use of her messianic powers (she can breathe underwater, restore life to dead animals, and converse with a talking sponge named Amanda) by her only visible parent (at least as well as Murray can manage), Julie reaches adulthood and explores life, death, Hell and the universe on the East Coast of the modern United States.

She is ten years old when she meets her "mother's oldest friend", Mr. Wyvern; the plot thereafter is derived from the intervention of family, fun in the Absecon Inlet, the guiding phantom eye of an enemy, Pastor Billy Milk, his fundamentalist sheep roving Atlantic City with juice jugs of milk, and the problems posed by her extra gifts. The overarching story of the book is that of a satirical theodicy, questioning why human beings suffer from evil and pain, and exploring the ingenuity with which we combat those conditions.

Julie eventually discovers that Amanda, the talking Sponge, is very likely God, and her spiritual (if not physiological) mother. Amanda cares deeply about the planet, but lives at a distance from it, and (because she is only a sponge) is not able to affect the world beyond the occasional miracle.

== Critical response ==
Fantasy scholar Michael-Anne Rubenstien writes:

Morrow regards satire as "a deadly serious business," used "to get the reader's attention." His humor provides a thin layer between the reader and troubling questions. For example, his character Julie wonders what sort of deity she is: "A deity of love, or of wrath? Love was wonderful, but with wrath you could do special effects." Morrow uses Only Begotten Daughter to suggest that what many believers seek in religion is the "special effects."

Rubenstien adds,

He dramatizes the dichotomy between the rational and the irrational. Divine or not, Julie believes in the uncertainty of life and the wonder of science. However, when she performs a miracle, her followers create a religion based upon her advice columns... Morrow regards this fascination with miracles and the need for "special effects" as irrational. The challenge is to view the world rationally, appreciating the world for the wonders that it holds, without relying on mysticism. ... A complex novel, Only Begotten Daughter raises questions about religion, intellect, beliefs, and relationships in a stunningly original and entertaining way.

Jo Walton has described it as "brilliant", commenting that it was "worthy of Hugo nomination".
