= Ament (surname) =

Ament is a surname. Notable people with the surname include:

- Jeff Ament (born 1963), American rock bassist
- Nate Ament (born 2006), American basketball player
- Pat Ament (born 1946), American rock climber
- Tom Ament (1937–2014), American politician
- Vanessa Ament (born 1955), American Foley artist and author
- William Scott Ament (1851–1909), controversial American missionary to China criticized by Mark Twain
