= Towing Jehovah =

1994 fantasy novel by James K. Morrow

- Author: James K. Morrow
- Language: English
- Publisher: Harcourt Brace
- Publication date: 1994
- ISBN: 0-15-190919-9 (first edition)
- Dewey Decimal: 813.54

Towing Jehovah is a 1994 fantasy novel by American writer James K. Morrow, published by Harcourt Brace. The book is about the death of God and the subsequent towing of his body across the Atlantic Ocean. In 1995 it received the World Fantasy Award for best novel, with two additional best novel awards. It was followed by two sequels in 1996 and 1999.

== Synopsis ==
God is dead, and now God's two-mile-long cadaver is floating in the Atlantic Ocean, just off the coast of Africa. Supertanker captain Anthony Van Horne meet the Archangel Raphael after taking a ritual bath in the Cux Cloister fountain of the Metropolitan Museum of Art. Raphael hires Van Horne to tow the cadaver into the Arctic, with the intention of having it be preserved by the cold.

== Reception ==
Towing Jehovah won the 1995 World Fantasy Award for best novel, and was nominated for the 1995 Hugo Award for Best Novel and the 1995 Nebula Award for Best Novel, shortlisted for the 1995 Arthur C. Clarke Award, and ranked second for the 1995 Locus Award for Best Fantasy Novel. As well, the French translation, En remorquant Jehovah, won the 1996 Grand Prix de l'Imaginaire for best foreign-language novel.

Jo Walton has described it as "brilliant but weird", and "terrific", while Steven H Silver has called it "interesting" and "intriguing", and commended Morrow's skill as a religious satirist, but criticized him for the quality of his satires of non-religious topics, saying that "[w]hen he turns his attention to satirizing other aspects of society, [Morrow] tends to fling his darts at random."

The Chicago Tribune praised Morrow for his "light-handed sense of satire", and said that "(Towing Jehovah's) title alone is enough to send your imagination racing off into the cosmos." The Los Angeles Times compared it to the works of Kurt Vonnegut, Fyodor Dostoyevsky, William Shakespeare, and Cecil B. DeMille, but stated that the novel was "buoyant" for the same reason that it is "ultimately, a little disappointing": namely, "Morrow doesn't care as much [as Vonnegut]".

== Sequels ==
A sequel, Blameless in Abaddon, was published in 1996, and a second sequel, The Eternal Footman, was published in 1999.
