= The Last Witchfinder =

2006 novel by James Morrow

- Cover for the US first edition of the novel
- Author: James Morrow
- Language: English
- Subject: Salem witch trials, witch hunts
- Genre: Historical fiction
- Published: 2006, William Morrow
- Publication place: United States
- Media type: Print, e-book
- Pages: 544 pages
- ISBN: 0060821795

The Last Witchfinder is a 2006 historical fiction novel by James Morrow. The book was first published in hardback on March 14, 2006 through William Morrow and has subsequently been re-published in paperback format. The Last Witchfinder follows a young girl whose father works as a witch-finder.

== Synopsis ==
Jennet is a young English girl whose witch hunter father is frequently away on witch hunts. She's left with her aunt Isobel, a fan of Isaac Newton's scientific style. The two become close, but eventually Isobel's viewpoints cause her to become the focus of a witchhunt that ends with her getting burned at the stake. Jennet is unsuccessful in her attempts to rescue her aunt from this grisly fate and as such, decides to fulfill her aunt's dying wish that Jennet bring down the Witchcraft Acts.

== Reception ==
Critical reception for The Last Witchfinder has been positive, and Publishers Weekly gave the book a favorable starred review. The Washington Post and The New York Times praised the work, and the Washington Post commented that the work was "so enchanting that when I finished the novel, I sat for a moment wondering when I could visit Jennet's grave in Philadelphia." USA Today wrote that they enjoyed the work's main character and that "Morrow injects humor and detail, but to enjoy this novel, you need a real appetite for the history of science." The Independent was more mixed in their review, as they felt that "if only this had been edited down to about half its length, it could have been a cracking picaresque yarn."

=== Awards ===
- BSFA Award (2006, nominated)
- Locus Fantasy Awards (2007, nominated)
