= This Is the Way the World Ends (novel) =

1986 apocalyptic novel by James Morrow

- First edition cover
- Author: James Morrow
- Language: English
- Genre: Post-apocalyptic novel
- Publisher: Henry Holt and Company
- Publication date: 1986
- Publication place: United States
- Media type: Print (hardcover)
- Pages: 319
- ISBN: 978-0-03-008037-1
- OCLC: 12665442
- Dewey Decimal: 813/.54
- LC Class: PS3563.O876 T5 1986

This Is the Way the World Ends is a post-apocalyptic novel by American writer James K. Morrow, published in 1986.

== Plot summary ==
This Is the Way the World Ends is a novel in which a megaton nuclear strike causes an apocalypse. The plot is driven by "The Unadmitted", a ghostly race of potential humans who never got to be born, due to nuclear holocaust. Determined to use their earthly tenures wisely, the unadmitted put the surviving architects of Armageddon—including the novel's everyman protagonist—on trial under the Nuremberg precedent.

== Reception ==
Dave Langford reviewed This Is the Way the World Ends for White Dwarf #88, and stated that "This is a harrowingly satirical book, whose main flaw lies in its treatment of the USSR. World War III, it turns out, started by accident: but only Americans are prosecuted by the unborn, the evil Russkies being prejudged as insane and unworthy of trial. This strikes me as an insecure foundation for a scathing attack on the arms race."

== Reviews ==
- Review by Paul O. Williams (1986) in Fantasy Review, July–August 1986
- Review by Tom Easton (1987) in Analog Science Fiction and Fact, January 1987
- Review by Jon Wallace (1987) in Vector 138
- Review by David V. Barrett (1987) in Vector 138
- Review by Darrell Schweitzer (1987) in Aboriginal Science Fiction, July–August 1987
- Review by Lee Montgomerie (1987) in Interzone #20, Summer 1987
- Review by Kathryn Cramer (1988) in The New York Review of Science Fiction, October 1988

== Awards and nominations ==
Year	Award		Result	Ref.
1987	John W. Campbell Memorial Award	—	Nominated–2	
1987	Locus Award	Science Fiction Novel	Nominated–22	
1987	Nebula Award	Novel	Shortlisted	
