= Jean Marigny =

French specialist in vampire myth

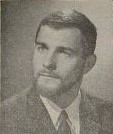
- Marigny in 1968
- Born: April 9, 1939 (age 87); Cherbourg, France
- Occupation: Vampire literature academic
- Notable work: Vampires: The World of the Undead
- Awards: Grand prix de l'Imaginaire

Jean Marigny (born 9 April 1939 in Cherbourg) is a French emeritus professor of Stendhal University in Grenoble, where he taught English and American literature. He is a specialist in vampire studies, from ancient folklore to modern vampire myth.

== Career ==
Jean Marigny has devoted much of his career to the myth of vampires, he is the founder of the research centre for studies in fantasy and horror in English and American literature: the Groupe d'Études et de Recherches sur le Fantastique (GERF, lit. 'Group of Studies and Research on Fantasy') which he directed several years at Stendhal University. He is also a member of the Canadian branch of the Transylvanian Society of Dracula.

After his doctoral dissertation in 1985, Le Vampire dans la littérature anglo-saxonne, he has published a number of essays and translated novels and short stories about the vampire theme. He published two anthologies, Histoires anglo-saxonnes de Vampires in 1978 and Les Vampires : Dracula et les siens (in collaboration with Roger Bozzetto) in 1997. He is the author of Sang pour sang, le réveil des vampires (1993), a copiously illustrated pocket book that has been translated into seven languages (including English) and was a reaction to Francis Coppola's Dracula. He also directed a collective work on Dracula for the collection 'Figures mythiques' published by Éditions Autrement. Marigny is considered one of the greatest vampire specialists around the world, particularly with regard to Anglo-Saxon fiction on the subject.

What fascinates Marigny about vampire is the character: a paradoxical being. As he explains, 'No fictional character is more emblematic of the fantasy than the vampire. If it is true that [...] fantasy is based on paradox, the vampire is the best illustration, since it is both dead and alive.'

== Publications ==
- Le Vampire dans la littérature anglo-saxonne (1983), doctoral dissertation on Anglo-Saxon literature (published by Didier-Érudition in 1985)
- Histoires anglo-saxonnes de Vampires (Librairie des Champs-Élysées, 1978)
- Les Vampires : Dracula et les siens, in collaboration with Roger Bozzetto (Omnibus, 1997)
- Sang pour sang : Le réveil des vampires, coll. « Découvertes Gallimard » (nº 161), série Culture et société. Paris : Éditions Gallimard, 1992 (new edition in 2010;)
  - UK edition – Vampires: The World of the Undead, 'New Horizons' series. Thames & Hudson, 1994
  - US edition – Vampires: Restless Creatures of the Night, "Abrams Discoveries" series. Harry N. Abrams, 1994
- Dracula (centennial of Bram Stoker's Dracula), 1997
- Les Mondes perdus de Clark Ashton Smith, La Clef d'Argent, 2007, ISBN 9782908254563
- Dracula, prince des ténèbres, in collaboration with Céline du Chéné, 2009
- La fascination des vampires, illustration de Albert-Joseph Penot, coll. « 50 Questions » (nº 49). Klincksieck, 2009
- Les femmes vampires, José Corti, 2010 (anthology co-directed with Jacques Finné)
- Vampires : de la légende au mythe moderne, La Martinière, 2011
