= Vampires: The World of the Undead =

1993 book by Jean Marigny

- First French edition. The cover featuring a modified version of the theatrical release poster of the 1958 film Dracula.
- Author: Jean Marigny
- Original title: Sang pour sang, le réveil des vampires
- Translator: Lory Frankel
- Cover artist: Henry Fuseli (US ed.); Bill Wiggins (FR & UK eds.)
- Language: French
- Series: Découvertes Gallimard●Traditions (FR); New Horizons (UK); Abrams Discoveries (US)
- Release number: 161st in collection
- Subject: Vampire folklore and literature
- Genre: Nonfiction monograph
- Publisher: Éditions Gallimard (FR); Thames & Hudson (UK); Harry N. Abrams (US)
- Publication date: 5 January 1993; 25 May 2010 (revised edition)
- Publication place: France
- English publication date: 1994
- Media type: Print (paperback)
- Pages: 144 (original edition); 128 (revised edition); 144 (UK & US editions)
- ISBN: 978-2-0705-3203-2 (first edition)
- OCLC: 939176278
- Preceded by: L'âge du rock
- Followed by: Autour du billard

Vampires: The World of the Undead (US title: Vampires: Restless Creatures of the Night; French: Sang pour sang, le réveil des vampires, lit. 'Blood for Blood: The Reawakening of the Vampires') is a 1993 illustrated monograph on cultural history of vampires and vampire folklore and literature. Written by the French professor of English literature and specialist in vampire myth, Jean Marigny, and published in pocket format by Éditions Gallimard as the 161st volume in their 'Découvertes' collection (known as 'New Horizons' in the United Kingdom, and 'Abrams Discoveries' in the United States).

== Origin ==
US (left) and UK editions.

The work was originally a reaction to Francis Coppola's 1992 film Dracula. After the film, media coverage around vampires was in full swing, and Gallimard, for their 'Découvertes' collection, was looking for an author to write a book about vampires. It was Jean Marigny, noticed by his dissertation on vampires in Anglo-Saxon literature, who would be chosen. After a few weeks of intensive work to match the release of the book with the release of the film in France (in 1993), Sang pour sang was born. It was an immediate success that the book has sold 130,000 copies and was reprinted several times. It has been translated into American and British English, Japanese, Russian, Slovene, Spanish, South Korean, simplified and traditional Chinese. A revised and updated French edition came out in 2010, driven by the success of the Twilight series.

== Introduction and synopsis ==
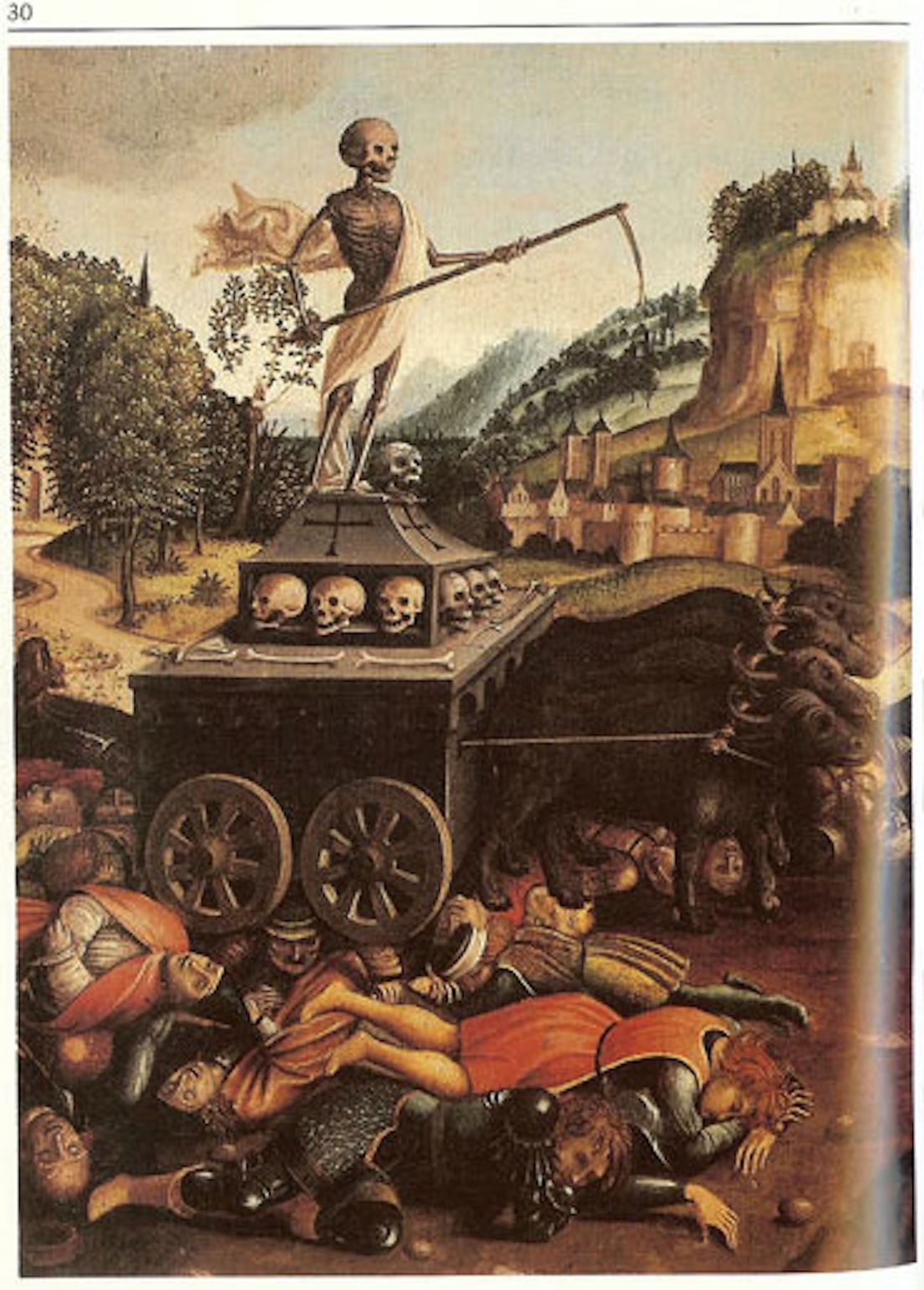
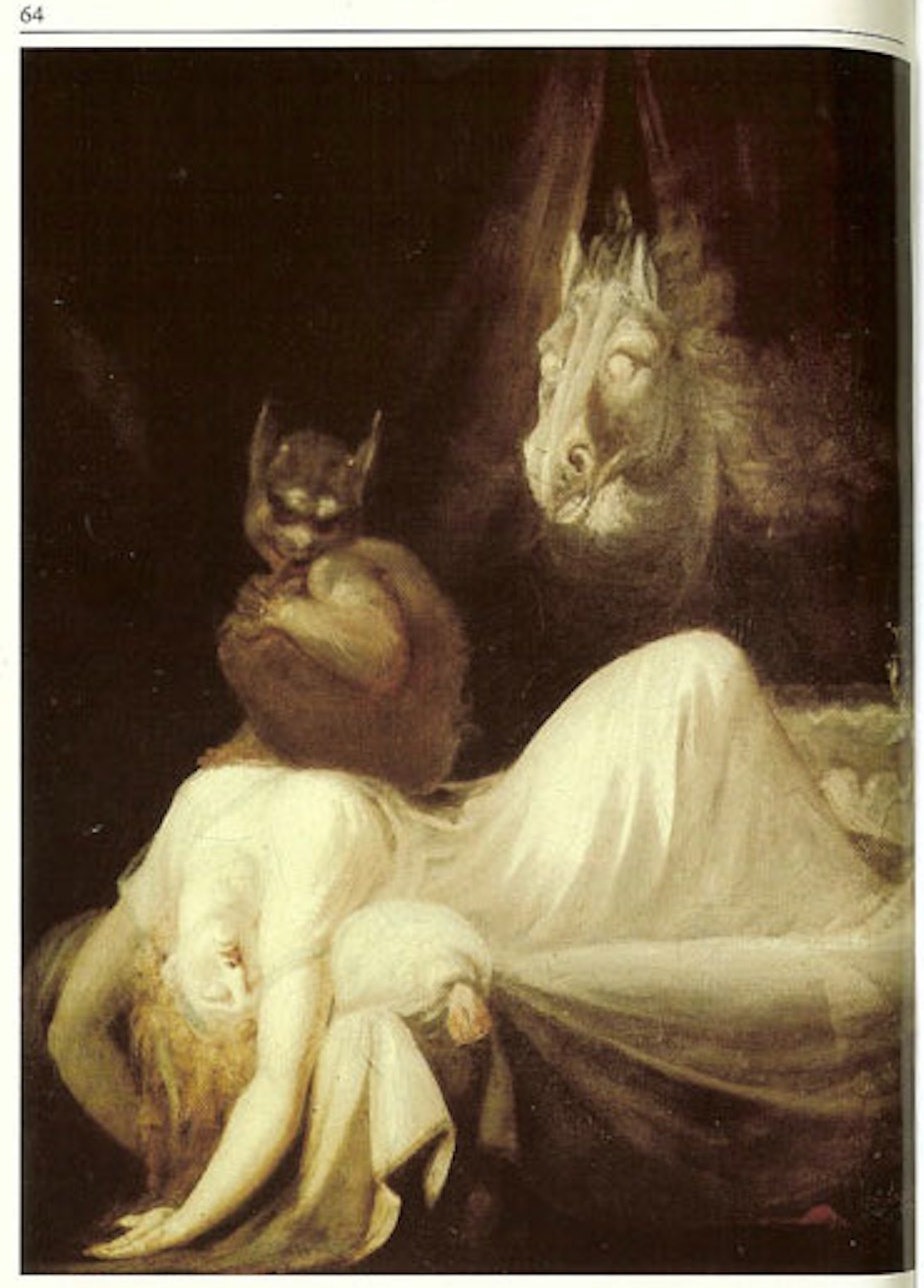
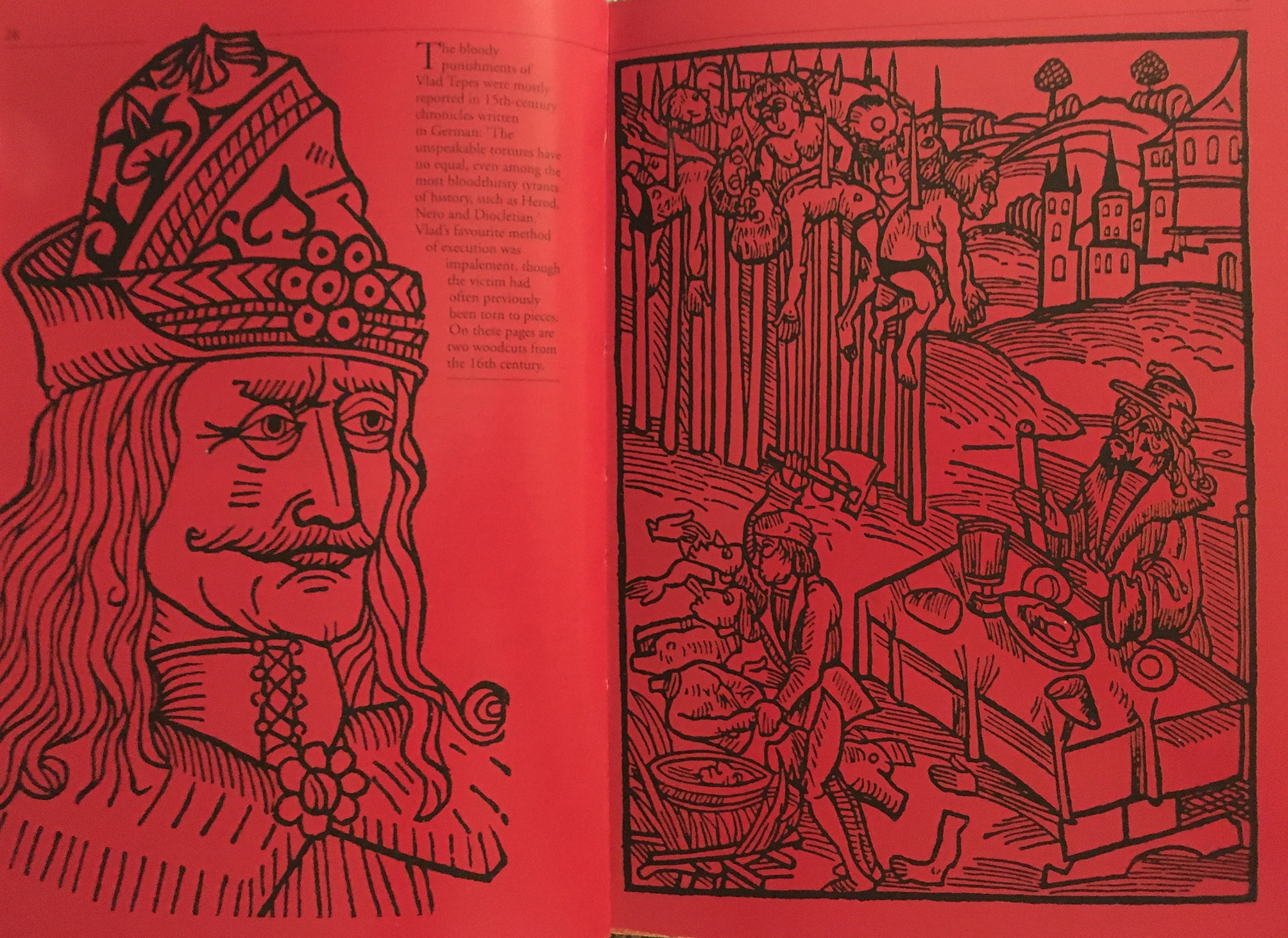
Vampires: The World of the Undead. Clockwise from upper left: The Triumph of Death, 15th-century Flemish painting (p. 30); The Nightmare by Henry Fuseli, 1782 painting (p. 64); Vlad the Impaler, woodcut, l: c. 1550, Nuremberg, Germany, r: 1500, Strasbourg, France (pp. 28–29).

The book is part of the Culture et société series (formerly belonging to Traditions series) in the 'Découvertes Gallimard' collection. According to the tradition of 'Découvertes', which is based on an abundant pictorial documentation and a way of bringing together visual documents and texts, enhanced by printing on coated paper, as commented in L'Express, 'genuine monographs, published like art books'. The book is almost like a 'graphic novel', replete with colour plates.

Here the author traces in four chapters the history and evolution of this creature in legends and literature, from antiquity to the gaslit streets of London: the origins of the myth, the reference to Greek mythology in particular, confusion with the undead, fears related to plague in medieval times... (chap. 1, 'Blood Lust', pp. 13–29); the Church officially recognises the existence of the living dead (chap. 2, 'The Consecrated Vampire', pp. 31–43). The golden age of the vampire is in the Enlightenment era where such beliefs should be banned (chap. 3, 'The Golden Age of Vampirism', pp. 45–63). Then in the Victorian era the vampire becomes an indisputable character of theatres and nightlife (chap. 4, 'The Reawakening of the Vampire', pp. 65–95). It is not Bram Stoker's Dracula, but The Vampyre of John Polidori is the first published modern vampire story, the book is therefore dedicated to this Romantic writer. Marigny explains in the book that Stoker was inspired by Sheridan Le Fanu's Carmilla for his own novel. The book addresses, among other topics, the cult of blood, Vlad the Impaler, Countess Báthory, superstitions, reaction of the Church to vampirism, vampires in cinema and the most incredible vampirism affair at London's Highgate Cemetery, in the 1970s.

The second part of the book, the 'Documents' section, contains a compilation of excerpts divided into seven parts: 1, Dracula, the tyrant (pp. 98–99); 2, Vampirism through the centuries (pp. 100–109); 3, The rationalist response (pp. 110–113); 4, The vampire in poetry (pp. 114–115); 5, The vampire in prose (pp. 116–127); 6, A night in Count Dracula's castle (pp. 128–129); 7, The vampire in film (pp. 130–131). These are followed by a filmography (pp. 132–137), further reading (p. 138), list of illustrations (pp. 138–141) and an index (pp. 141–142).

== Reception ==
The French daily Le Monde wrote, '[the book is] a very beautiful-illustrated, very informative and very playful little work, a vademecum to the land of blood drinkers.'

On Vampirisme, the review says: 'This work by Jean Marigny, published in 1993, is a model of its kind. Here the author traces the chronology of the vampire myth, from antiquity to the present day. [...] The book is also very well documented, very well illustrated, and embellished with some most interesting appendices, whether they are anecdotes about Dracula, retranscription of some most famous reports confirming the existence of vampires, excerpts from novels and poetry, even from prayers for hunting vampires. In short, if you want to go deeper into the subject and learn more about vampirology, this is the book for you.'

Matthieu Buge gave a positive review in his article for the online magazine Le Salon Littéraire: 'With abundant illustrations and documents, Jean Marigny explains simply the multiple origins of what would eventually become Count Dracula. [...] The vampire is such a frequent character in the literary and audiovisual fictions of the past two centuries that he has become almost too familiar to us, leading us to rarely question him.' With a large number of documents from various periods, Jean Marigny therefore rediscovers with pleasure many fascinating details of the construction of the legend, its springs and its propagators, in an accessible, synthetic and complete book like any good "Découvertes Gallimard".'
