= Vanessa Ament =

American author, academic, Foley artist, and musician

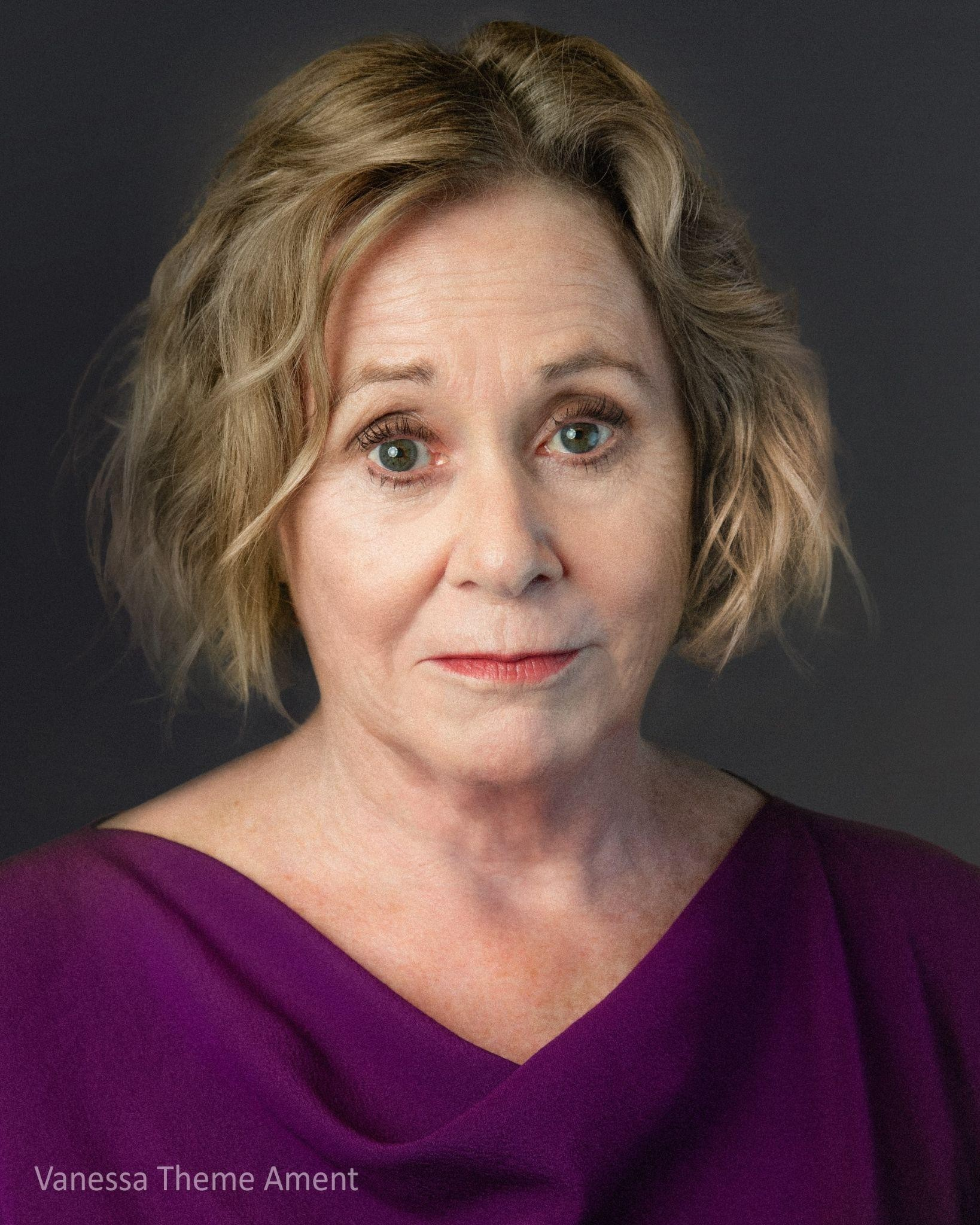
- Born: Vanessa Theme Ament; January 8, 1955 (age 71); Glendale, California, U.S.
- Education: Whittier College (B.A., Theatre) Starr King School for the Ministry (M.Div., 1990) Georgia State University (Ph.D., 2014)
- Occupation: ● Foley artist ● author ● academic ● musician ● playwright
- Years active: 1972–present
- Spouse: David Edwin Stone (m. 1990; div. 2010)
- Website: http://vanessathemeament.com/

Vanessa Theme Ament (born January 8, 1955, in Glendale, California) is an American Foley artist, author, academic, musician, and playwright. She is best known for The Foley Grail: The Art of Performing Sound for Film, Games, and Animation, first published in 2009 and now in its third edition (2021), one of the first scholarly monographs devoted to the craft of Foley sound in film and television. As a Hollywood Foley artist she worked on major productions spanning more than two decades, including Platoon (1986), Predator (1987), Die Hard (1988), and Beauty and the Beast (1991), and received three Motion Picture Sound Editors Golden Reel Certificates for Foley. She served as the Edmund F. and Virginia B. Ball Endowed Chair in Telecommunications at Ball State University in Muncie, Indiana.

== Early life and education ==
Ament was born on January 8, 1955, in Glendale, California, and was raised in San Luis Obispo County on the central coast of California. She represents the third generation of a film family: her grandfather worked in silent films and later at RKO, and her mother was a dancer and assistant choreographer in the film industry. She attended Arroyo Grande High School, where she participated in the theatre department.

Ament earned a Bachelor of Arts in Theatre from Whittier College. After graduating she worked for the Glendale Regional Arts Council as an Artist-in-the-Schools in the field of theatre. In her thirties she earned a Master of Divinity (M.Div.) as a Unitarian Universalist from Starr King School for the Ministry, part of the Graduate Theological Union in Berkeley, California (1990). She later received a Ph.D. in Communication, with a concentration in Moving Image Studies, from Georgia State University in Atlanta, Georgia (2014), with a dissertation titled From Splicing to Dicing: Film Sound Design Goes Digital in the 1990s.

== Career ==
=== Early performing career ===
During the 1970s Ament continued to pursue acting. In 1976 she appeared in the comedy film Revenge of the Cheerleaders, directed by Richard Lerner, in the role of a Lincoln Cheerleader. The film also features an early screen appearance by David Hasselhoff.

=== Foley artistry ===
Working from 1980 into the early 2000s, Ament was active as a Foley artist, sound editor, and voice actor for film and television. She also served as a Sound Supervisor for student productions at the American Film Institute (AFI) and the University of Southern California (USC).

On television she worked on long-running series including Knots Landing, Dallas, and Cagney & Lacey. Her feature film credits include Prizzi's Honor (1985), Platoon (1986), Predator (1987), Die Hard (1988), sex, lies, and videotape (1989), Edward Scissorhands (1990), Beauty and the Beast (1991), RoboCop 2 (1991), Noises Off... (1992), Batman Returns (1992), Malice (1993), Dolores Claiborne (1995), A Goofy Movie (1995), and Chain Reaction (1996), among many others.

Ament received Motion Picture Sound Editors Golden Reel Certificates for Foley for The Dollmaker (1984), Predator (1987), and Die Hard (1988), with additional nominations for other productions. In 1989, she presented a public Foley demonstration and masterclass at the Denver International Film Festival. That same year, she appeared as a guest on Late Night with David Letterman, in an episode broadcast July 27, 1989.

Ament also gave public demonstrations of the Foley craft during this period. In July 1989 she conducted a workshop series at the Exploratorium in San Francisco, presenting live, interactive demonstrations on July 8 and 9 that showed museum visitors how everyday physical props are synchronized to film images to create sound effects; the residency formed part of a regional educational tour that included San Francisco Bay Area media appearances.

== Publishing and journalism ==
Ament published the MovieSound Newsletter, an industry periodical covering post-production sound during the transition from analog to digital filmmaking. Sound editor David E. Stone served as editor and chief writer from 1989 to 1994.^{[8]} The newsletter's content was later compiled and published by Stone and Ament as Hollywood Sound Design and Moviesound Newsletter: A Case Study of the End of the Analog Age (Routledge, 2016).

In 2021 Ament published Divergent Tracks: How Three Film Communities Revolutionized Digital Film Sound (Bloomsbury Academic), a cultural historiography examining how sound designers in the Los Angeles, San Francisco Bay Area, and New York film communities each adapted to the shift from analog to digital postproduction sound in the 1990s, using case studies including Barton Fink, Bram Stoker's Dracula, and The English Patient.

== Academic career ==
Ament has taught at a number of universities since 2001, including Cuesta College (San Luis Obispo), Columbia College Chicago, DePaul University, and Georgia State University. Following completion of her Ph.D. in 2014, she joined the faculty of Ball State University in Muncie, Indiana, as the Edmund F. and Virginia B. Ball Endowed Chair Professor of Telecommunications.

In June 2018, Ament appeared on Turner Classic Movies (TCM) alongside host Ben Mankiewicz to introduce films as part of the channel's "Mad About Musicals" programming. The segment accompanied an online multimedia course she developed in partnership between TCM, Ball State University, and the Canvas platform, examining the history of the Hollywood musical and its cultural and technological evolution.

Ament has served on the steering committee of Cinesonika. In 2016 she helped bring the event to Ball State University for its first United States appearance.

== Music and songwriting ==
In 2004 she released a jazz album titled Working Without a Net. She contributed music to the 1999 independent film Foreign Correspondents, for which she wrote and performed the song "Every Other Night". Ament is a member of the American Federation of Musicians (AFM) and BMI.

== Bibliography ==
=== Books ===
- Ament, Vanessa Theme (2009). The Foley Grail: The Art of Performing Sound for Film, Games, and Animation (1st ed.). Focal Press. ISBN 978-0-240-81250-0.
- Ament, Vanessa Theme (2014). The Foley Grail: The Art of Performing Sound for Film, Games, and Animation (2nd ed.). Focal Press / Routledge.
- Stone, David E.; Vanessa Theme Ament (2016). Hollywood Sound Design and Moviesound Newsletter: A Case Study of the End of the Analog Age. Routledge. ISBN 978-1-138-89064-0.
- Ament, Vanessa Theme (2021). Divergent Tracks: How Three Film Communities Revolutionized Digital Film Sound. Bloomsbury Academic. ISBN 978-1-5013-5922-4.
- Ament, Vanessa Theme (2021). The Foley Grail: The Art of Performing Sound for Film, Games, and Animation (3rd ed.). Routledge. ISBN 978-0-367-44224-8.

=== Book chapters ===
- Ament, Vanessa Theme. "The New Hollywood (1981–1999)." Co-authored with Jay Beck. In Kathryn Kalinak (ed.), Sound: Dialogue, Music, and Effects (Behind the Silver Screen series, vol. 8, Jon Lewis, series editor). Oxford University Press, 2015.
- Ament, Vanessa Theme. "Revealing Industry Culture: A Cultural Ethnographic Approach to Postproduction Sound." In Michael Filimowicz (ed.), Doing Research in Sound Design. Routledge Sound Design Series, 2021.
- Ament, Vanessa Theme. "Humming the Foley, Singing the Sound: Designing Sound with a Musical Perspective." In James Buhler & Mark Durrand (eds.), Music in Action Film: Sounds Like Action! (Music and Screen Media Series, Neil Lerner, series editor). 2020.
- Ament, Vanessa Theme. "Performative Sound Design: A Cultural Perspective on the Art and Craft of Foley." In The Routledge Handbook of Sound Design. Routledge, 2024.

=== Conference papers ===
- Ament, Vanessa Theme, and Richard L. Edwards. "For More TLC (Teacher-Learner Connections) in Online Education." Proceedings of the Distance Teaching and Learning Conference, August 7–9, 2018.
- Ament, Vanessa Theme, and Richard L. Edwards. "Better Teaching and More Learning in Mobile Learning Courses: Towards a Model of Personable Learning." Proceedings of the IADIS International Conference of Mobile Learning, April 14–16, 2018.
- Ament, Vanessa Theme, and Richard L. Edwards. "Persuade or Be Persuaded: Personable Learning, Socratic Reasoning, and Prompt Imagineering in Teaching and Learning with Generative AI." Proceedings of the Futures 2025 Conference in Education, July 9–10, 2025.

=== Discography ===
- Working Without a Net (CD). Self-released / CD Baby, 2004.

== Filmography ==
Year	Title	Role	Category	Notes
1976	Revenge of the Cheerleaders	Lincoln Cheerleader	Actress	Also features David Hasselhoff in an early screen role
1984	The Dollmaker	Foley artist	Film	MPSE Golden Reel Certificate for Foley
1985	Prizzi's Honor	Foley artist	Film	
1986	Platoon	Foley artist	Film	Academy Award for Best Sound
1987	Predator	Foley artist	Film	MPSE Golden Reel Certificate for Foley
1988	Die Hard	Foley artist	Film	MPSE Golden Reel Certificate for Foley
1989	Late Night with David Letterman	Herself	Television	
1989	sex, lies, and videotape	Foley artist	Film	
1990	AM Los Angeles	Herself	Television	
1990	Edward Scissorhands	Foley artist	Film	
1991	Beauty and the Beast	Foley artist	Film	Disney animated feature
1991	RoboCop 2	Foley artist	Film	
1992	Noises Off...	Foley artist	Film	
1992	Batman Returns	Foley artist	Film	
1993	Malice	Foley artist	Film	
1995	Dolores Claiborne	Foley artist	Film	
1995	A Goofy Movie	Foley artist	Film	Disney animated feature
1996	Chain Reaction	Foley artist	Film	
1997	Cats Don't Dance	Foley artist / supervising Foley editor	Film	
1997	Pooh's Grand Adventure: The Search for Christopher Robin	Foley artist / Foley editor / dialogue editor	Film	
1999	Olive, the Other Reindeer	Foley artist / supervising Foley editor	Television	TV film
1999	Foreign Correspondents	Songwriter / performer	Film	Wrote and performed "Every Other Night"
2000	The Little Mermaid II: Return to the Sea	Foley artist / supervising Foley editor	Film	
2001	Gary & Mike	Foley artist / supervising Foley editor	Television	TV series
2018	Turner Classic Movies – "Mad About Musicals"	Herself	Television	Introduced films alongside Ben Mankiewicz; part of Ball State University / TCM online course

== Awards and recognition ==
Year	Award	Project
1984	Motion Picture Sound Editors Golden Reel Certificate – Foley	The Dollmaker
1987	Motion Picture Sound Editors Golden Reel Certificate – Foley	Predator
1988	Motion Picture Sound Editors Golden Reel Certificate – Foley	Die Hard

== Professional memberships ==
Throughout her career Ament has been a member of the Motion Picture Sound Editors (MPSE), the Cinema Audio Society (CAS), Broadcast Music, Inc. (BMI), the American Federation of Musicians (AFM), SAG-AFTRA, Actors' Equity Association, the Society of Composers and Lyricists (SCL), Women in Film, and the Academy of Television Arts and Sciences (ATAS).
