= David E. Stone =

American sound editor (born 1947)

David E. Stone, M.P.S.E.
- Born: David Edwin Stone; December 11, 1947 (age 78); Philadelphia, Pennsylvania, U.S.
- Other names: David Stone; Dave Stone
- Occupation: Sound editor
- Years active: 1975-2004
- Spouse: Vanessa Theme Ament (1990-2010) (divorced)
- Children: 1
- Family: Richard Stone (brother) (1953-2001)

David E. Stone (born December 11, 1947) is an American sound editor. He won an Academy Award for the film Bram Stoker's Dracula for Best Sound Editing during the 65th Academy Awards, he shared his Oscar with Tom C. McCarthy.

He has over 110 film credits from 1975 to 2004. Including many direct to video animated films in the 1990s, as well as animated specials in the 1970s and the 1980s.

== Personal life ==
He married Foley editor Vanessa Ament in 1990, they had 1 child together. They divorced in 2010.

His brother Richard Stone was a composer.

== Selected filmography ==
- Ocean's Twelve (2004)
- I Am David (2003)
- Looney Tunes: Back in Action (2003)
- A Man Apart (2003)
- Rugrats Go Wild (2003)
- The Wild Thornberrys Movie (2002)
- Ghosts of Mars (2001)
- Recess: School's Out (2001)
- Lady and the Tramp II: Scamp's Adventure (2001)
- Ocean's Eleven (2001)
- Training Day (2001)
- The Little Mermaid 2: Return to the Sea (2000)
- Olive, the Other Reindeer (1999)
- The Green Mile (1999)
- Varsity Blues (1999)
- The Lion King 2: Simba's Pride (1998)
- City of Angels (1998)
- Pooh's Grand Adventure: The Search for Christopher Robin (1997)
- Cats Don't Dance (1997)
- Ghosts of Mississippi (1997)
- Spawn (1997)
- Chain Reaction (1996)
- Dolores Claiborne (1995)
- A Goofy Movie (1995)
- Clear and Present Danger (1994)
- Speed (1994)
- Malice (1993)
- The Muppet Christmas Carol (1992)
- Batman Returns (1992)
- Bram Stoker's Dracula (1992)
- Reservoir Dogs (1992)
- Beauty and the Beast (1991)
- Dying Young (1991)
- Edward Scissorhands' (1990)
- Gremlins 2: The New Batch (1990)
- Indiana Jones and the Last Crusade (1989)
- The War of the Roses (1989)
- Beetlejuice (1988)
- Die Hard (1988)
- Predator (1987)
- Legal Eagles (1986)
- Solarbabies (1986)
- Star Trek IV: The Voyage Home (1986)
- Top Gun (1986)
- Here Come the Littles (1985)
- Weird Science (1985)
- 2010 (1984)
- Dreamscape (1984)
- Gremlins (1984)
- Streets of Fire (1984)
- The Dead Zone (1983)
- Lone Wolf McQuade (1983)
- The Twilight Zone Movie (1983)
- Halloween II (1981)
- The Flintstones Meet Rockula and Frankenstone (1979)
- The Flintstones: Little Big League (1977)
