= Bram Stoker's Dracula (1992 film) =

Film directed by Francis Ford Coppola

- Theatrical release poster
- Directed by: Francis Ford Coppola
- Screenplay by: James V. Hart
- Based on: Dracula by Bram Stoker
- Produced by: Francis Ford Coppola; Fred Fuchs; Charles Mulvehill
- Starring: Gary Oldman; Winona Ryder; Anthony Hopkins; Keanu Reeves
- Cinematography: Michael Ballhaus
- Edited by: Nicholas C. Smith; Glen Scantlebury; Anne Goursaud
- Music by: Wojciech Kilar
- Production companies: American Zoetrope; Osiris Films
- Distributed by: Columbia Pictures
- Release date: November 13, 1992 (United States)
- Running time: 127 minutes
- Country: United States
- Language: English
- Budget: $40 million
- Box office: $215.9 million

Bram Stoker's Dracula is a 1992 American Gothic horror film co-produced and directed by Francis Ford Coppola and written by James V. Hart, based on the eponymous 1897 novel Dracula by Bram Stoker. The film stars Gary Oldman, Winona Ryder, Anthony Hopkins, and Keanu Reeves. Set in 19th-century England and Romania, it follows Count Dracula (Oldman), a vampire formerly known as the Wallachian ruler Vlad the Impaler, who falls in love with Mina Murray (Ryder), the fiancée of his solicitor Jonathan Harker (Reeves). When Dracula wreaks havoc in London, Professor Abraham Van Helsing (Hopkins), an expert in vampirism, is summoned to bring an end to his reign of terror.

Principal photography began at Sony Pictures Studios and Universal Studios Lot on October 14, 1991, and concluded on January 31, 1992, in addition to reshoots at Saint Sophia Greek Orthodox Cathedral in Los Angeles. The closing credits theme "Love Song for a Vampire" was written and performed by Annie Lennox.

Bram Stoker's Dracula was theatrically released by Columbia Pictures in the United States on November 13, 1992, to mixed reviews from critics, with praise for Coppola's direction, the production values, and Oldman's performance, but criticism for the story and Reeves' performance. The film opened at the top of the box office, grossing $215.9 million against its $40 million production budget. At the 65th Academy Awards, the film received four nominations and won three, Best Costume Design for Eiko Ishioka, Best Sound Editing, and Best Makeup.

== Plot ==
In 1462, Vlad Dracula returns from a victory in his campaign against the Ottoman Empire to find his beloved wife Elisabeta has committed suicide after his enemies falsely reported his death. A Romanian Orthodox priest tells him that his wife's soul is damned to Hell for her suicide. Enraged, Vlad desecrates the chapel and renounces God, declaring he will rise from the grave to avenge Elisabeta with all the powers of darkness. He stabs his sword into the chapel's stone cross and drinks the blood that pours from it, becoming a vampire.

In 1897, solicitor Jonathan Harker takes the elderly Transylvanian Count Dracula as a client from his colleague R. M. Renfield, who has gone insane and is now an inmate in Dr. Jack Seward's asylum. Jonathan travels to Dracula's castle to arrange Dracula's real estate acquisitions in London. There, he meets Dracula, who finds a picture of his fiancée Mina Murray and believes she is Elisabeta reincarnated. Dracula leaves Jonathan to be fed upon by his brides, while he sails to England with Transylvanian soil, taking up residence at Carfax Abbey.

In London, Dracula, in werewolf form, hypnotically seduces and bites Mina's best friend Lucy Westenra, with whom Mina is staying while Jonathan is in Transylvania. Lucy's deteriorating health and behavioral changes prompt former suitors Quincey Morris and Dr. Seward, along with her fiancé Arthur Holmwood to summon Dr. Abraham Van Helsing, Seward's mentor, who recognizes Lucy as being the victim of a vampire. Dracula, appearing young and handsome during daylight, meets and charms Mina. Mina develops feelings for Dracula, accompanying him on several outings. When Mina receives word from Jonathan, who has escaped the castle and recovered at a convent, she travels to Romania to marry him. A heartbroken Dracula transforms Lucy into a vampire. Van Helsing, Holmwood, Seward, and Morris kill the undead Lucy the following night.

After Jonathan and Mina return to London, he and Van Helsing lead the others to Carfax Abbey, where they destroy the Count's boxes of soil. Dracula enters the asylum and kills Renfield for warning Mina of his presence. He visits Mina, who is staying in Seward's quarters, and confesses that he murdered Lucy and has been terrorizing Mina's friends. Mina admits that she still loves him and remembers Elisabeta's previous life; at her insistence, Dracula begins transforming her into a vampire. The hunters burst into the bedroom, and Dracula, in a bat humanoid form, claims Mina as his bride before escaping as a swarm of rats. As Mina changes, Van Helsing hypnotizes her and learns via her connection with Dracula that he is sailing home in his last remaining box. The hunters depart for Varna to intercept him, but Dracula reads Mina's mind and evades them. Van Helsing and Mina travel to the Borgo Pass and the castle, while the other hunters try to stop the Romani from transporting Dracula.

At night, Van Helsing and Mina are approached by Dracula's brides. Mina succumbs to their chanting and attempts to seduce Van Helsing. Before Mina can feed on his blood, Van Helsing places a communion wafer on her forehead, leaving a mark that slows her transformation. He surrounds them with a ring of fire to protect them from the brides, then kills the brides the following morning. Dracula's carriage arrives at the castle, pursued by the hunters. During a fight between the hunters and Romani, Morris is fatally stabbed in the back and Dracula emerges at sunset. Jonathan slits his throat while Morris stabs him in the heart. Van Helsing and Jonathan allow Mina to retreat with the Count while Morris dies in the company of his friends.

In the chapel where he renounced God, Dracula lies dying. He and Mina share a kiss as the candles adorning the chapel light up and the cross repairs itself. Dracula reverts to his younger self and asks Mina to give him peace. Mina thrusts the knife through his heart. As he dies, the mark on her forehead disappears, freeing her from his curse. She decapitates him and gazes up at a fresco of Vlad and Elisabeta ascending to heaven together, finally reunited.

== Cast ==
- Gary Oldman as Count Dracula / Vlad the Impaler
- Winona Ryder as Mina Harker and Elisabeta
- Anthony Hopkins as Professor Abraham Van Helsing and the Romanian Orthodox priest
- Keanu Reeves as Jonathan Harker
- Richard E. Grant as Dr. Jack Seward
- Cary Elwes as Lord Arthur Holmwood
- Billy Campbell as Quincey P. Morris
- Sadie Frost as Lucy Westenra
- Tom Waits as R. M. Renfield

Monica Bellucci, Michaela Bercu, and Florina Kendrick portray Dracula's Brides. Jay Robinson appears as Mr. Hawkins, Harker's employer.

== Themes ==
=== Occultism ===
Coppola's film makes a direct connection between Dracula's vampiric origin and occultism/satanism. In the opening scene of the film, after learning that his wife committed suicide and is denied salvation, Dracula denies God and makes a deal with the dark forces. This is symbolically verified with Dracula plunging his sword into the crucifix, which immediately starts to bleed excessive amounts of blood that Dracula drinks as a sign of "bloodpact" with the Devil.

=== AIDS pandemic ===
Upon release, The New York Times' Frank Rich suggested that the film drew upon the prevalent fear of HIV/AIDS in the 1990s. Coppola, according to Rich, gives to the viewers a movie that both frightens and arouses them by playing off their unchecked fear of the spread of AIDS as an invasion of the national bloodstream.

Van Helsing comments to his medical students that civilization and "syphilization" advanced together; this is viewed as much as a commentary on Coppola's times—during the spread of HIV/AIDS—as it was on Stoker's (who may have died of syphilis, as speculated in some biographies of Stoker).

== Production ==
=== Development and casting ===
Winona Ryder initially brought James V. Hart's screenplay to the attention of Francis Ford Coppola. The director had agreed to meet with her so the two could clear the air after she was cast in The Godfather Part III to play Mary Corleone in September 1989 when the previous choice Rebecca Schaeffer was murdered by an obsessed fan Robert John Bardo two months earlier. This caused production delays on that film, and Ryder's eventual withdrawal led her to believe Coppola disliked her. According to Ryder: "I never really thought he would read it. He was so consumed with Godfather III. As I was leaving, I said, 'If you have a chance, read this script.' He glanced down at it politely, but when he saw the word Dracula, his eyes lit up. It was one of his favorite stories from camp." Ryder also explained that "what attracted me to the script is the fact that it's a very emotional love story, which is not really what you think of when you think about Dracula. Mina, like many women in the late 1800s, has a lot of repressed sexuality. Everything about women in that era, the way those corsets forced them to move, was indicative of repression. To express passion was freakish". Coppola was also attracted to the sensual elements of the screenplay and said that he wanted portions of the picture to resemble an "erotic dream". To prepare for Bram Stoker's Dracula, as the movie would be called, Coppola screened Citizen Kane, Ivan the Terrible, and Chimes at Midnight. In the months leading up to its release, Hollywood insiders who had seen the movie felt Coppola's film was too odd, violent, and strange to succeed at the box office, and dubbed it "Bonfire of the Vampires" after the notorious 1990 box-office failure The Bonfire of the Vanities.

Gary Oldman has stated that he never considered Count Dracula to be a "bucket list" role for him. Regarding the main reason he agreed to the role: "It was an opportunity to work with Coppola, who I consider one of the great American directors. That was enough, really. It was my first big American movie, made on a big set with lots of costumes. For a young actor, that was a tremendous experience." Another reason why Oldman wanted to play Dracula was because he wanted to say: "I've crossed oceans of time to find you" and to him it was worth playing the role just to say that line. Gabriel Byrne screen test for Dracula, alongside Kyle MacLachlan as Jonathan Harker, but neither were cast.

Christian Slater was offered the role of Harker, but he turned it down; a decision he later regretted. As for casting Keanu Reeves in the role, Coppola said of his casting choice: "We tried to get some kind of matinée idol for the part of Jonathan, because it isn't such a great part. If we all were to go to the airport [...] Keanu is the one that the girls would just besiege." Coppola has stated that Reeves worked harder on his accent than most people realized: "He tried so hard. That was the problem, actually—he wanted to do it perfectly and in trying to do it perfectly it came off as stilted. I tried to get him to just relax with it and not do it so fastidiously. So maybe I wasn't as critical of him, but that's because I like him personally so much. To this day he's a prince in my eyes."

=== Costume, set, hair, and makeup design ===
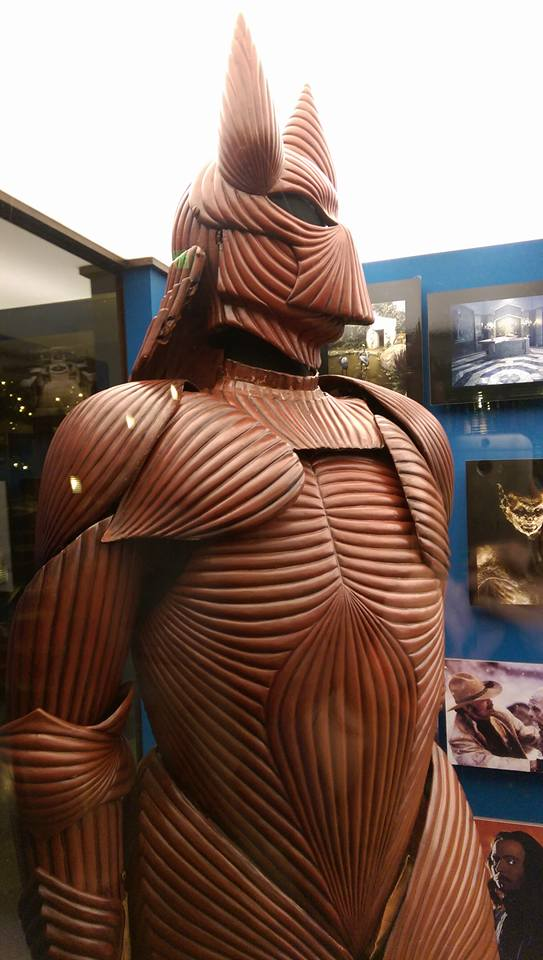
Dracula's armor on display at Coppola's winery in California

Coppola chose to invest a significant amount of the budget in costumes in order to showcase the actors, whom he considered the "jewels" of the feature. The film itself was built on the stylistic premise that the costumes were of greater importance to the film's execution than the sets. Due to this, designer Eiko Ishioka was given immense freedom to design not only Dracula's clothes but also his personae. Ishioka decided that Dracula would be "male and female, old and young, ugly and handsome, animal and human."

Coppola had a team of artists—veteran production artist Mentor Huebner, future DreamWorks Animation veteran Peter Ramsey, and future Hellboy creator Mike Mignola—storyboard the entire film in advance to carefully illustrate each planned shot. This process created around a thousand images. He turned the drawings into a choppy animated film—an animatic—with added music, and spliced in scenes from the French version of Beauty and the Beast that Jean Cocteau directed in 1946 along with paintings by Gustav Klimt and other symbolist artists. He showed the animated film to his designers to give them an idea of the mood and theme he was aiming for. Coppola also asked the set costume designers to simply bring him designs which were "weird". "'Weird' became a code word for 'Let's not do formula'", he later recalled. "'Give me something that either comes from the research or that comes from your own nightmares.' I gave them paintings, and I gave them drawings, and I talked to them about how I thought the imagery could work."

The film's hair and makeup designer, Michèle Burke, recalls: "Francis didn't want the typical Dracula that had already been done in Hollywood. He wanted something different; a new Dracula without the widow's peak, cape, or pale-white skin." Burke says she used her Catholic upbringing and angelic imagery for design inspiration, as well as the 19th-century attire created by costume designer Eiko Ishioka.

Because Dracula's scenes did not start filming until very late into the production, Oldman had plenty of downtime to come up with additional ideas for his character. According to Coppola, "He'd [Oldman] get together with the makeup designer Greg Cannom and, before I knew it, we were going to have not just one monster but five monsters in the film." For Oldman, the makeup required for the role was taxing: for the elderly Dracula, he spent nearly seven hours in the makeup chair, then after ten hours on the set, spent another hour-and-a-half having it removed.

=== Filming ===
Due to delays and cost overruns on some of Coppola's previous projects such as Apocalypse Now and One from the Heart, Coppola was determined to complete Bram Stoker's Dracula on time and on budget. To accomplish this, he filmed on sound stages to avoid potential troubles caused by inclement weather.

While preparing to play Dracula, Oldman took lessons with a singing teacher in order to drive his voice one octave lower. Coppola brought his principal actors to his 1,700-acre (690 ha) Napa Valley winery and estate for improvisations and exercises. The actors read the novel aloud, went through the script, and sat down for communal dinners. The idea was to break down barriers and establish relationships that would translate to the film. The summer-camp atmosphere extended to all the principal actors except Oldman. The director instructed Elwes, Campbell, and Grant to go horseback-riding and hot-air ballooning together, getting to know each other and their characters better, and sent Ryder and Frost off to do things together, while Oldman was kept isolated from the cast; this extended to living arrangements throughout filming, with all the vampire hunters living on one property and Oldman living on another. The rest of the cast met Oldman for the first time on set during rehearsals, after which they would not see him again until filming.

Coppola brought in acting coach Greta Seacat to coach Frost and Ryder for their erotic scenes, as he felt uncomfortable discussing sexuality with the young actresses. However, he did ask Oldman to speak seductively off camera to Frost while they were filming a scene in which she writhed alone in her bed in ecstasy. She later classified the things Oldman said to her as "very unrepeatable". Winona Ryder found the intensity of Oldman's acting style too much at times; the two fell out early in the filming process and had difficulty working together from then on. Coppola stated, "they got along and then one day they didn't—absolutely didn't get along. None of us were privy to what had happened." Ryder has referred to the "trauma" of the experience and said that she "felt there was a danger" while working with Oldman. However, she has also referred to her friction with Oldman as "teen drama", stating, "He [Gary] was going through a divorce, and I think I can say this because he's pretty open about it, but he's been sober for a long time now, and he's raised three kids, and he's a dream. He's a good friend of mine now".

In 2020, Ryder also stated that Reeves and Hopkins once refused Coppola's direction to verbally abuse her to make her cry during a scene that required an emotional reaction. However, Coppola denied this and described the situation as him instructing Oldman—in character—to whisper improvised words both to her and other actors on set to scare them. Ryder agreed with Coppola, and a spokesperson for Ryder stated that "He asked the actors in character to say horrible things to Winona as a technique to help her cry for the scene. Although that technique didn't work for her, she loves and respects him and considers it a great privilege to have worked with him."

=== Special effects ===
Coppola was insistent that he did not want to use any kind of contemporary special effects techniques such as computer-generated imagery when making the movie, instead wishing to use antiquated effects techniques from the early history of cinema, which he felt would be more appropriate given that the film's period setting coincides with the origin of film. He initially hired a standard visual effects team, but when they told him that the things he wanted to achieve were impossible without using modern digital technology, Coppola disagreed and fired them, replacing them with his son Roman Coppola. As a result, all of the visual effects seen in the film were achieved without the use of optical or computer-generated effects, instead using on-set and in-camera methods. For example, any sequences that would have typically required the use of compositing were instead achieved by either rear projection with actors placed in front of a screen with an image projected behind them, or through multiple exposure by shooting a background slate then rewinding the film through the camera and shooting the foreground slate on the same piece of film, all the while using matting techniques to ensure that only the desired areas of film were exposed. Forced perspectives were often employed to combine miniature effects or matte paintings with full-sized elements, or create distorted views of reality, such as holding the camera upside down or at odd angles to create the effect of objects defying the laws of physics. When filming Dracula's POV, Roman took individual images with his camera in an erratic way, sometimes only a few random frames per second, and then sudden bursts of several frames per second. For Lucy's movements, she did her performance backwards, and the film then processed in reverse.

== Reception ==
=== Critical response ===
On Rotten Tomatoes, the film holds an approval rating of 69% based on 124 reviews, with an average rating of 6.4/10. The site's critics consensus reads, "Overblown in the best sense of the word, Francis Ford Coppola's vision of Bram Stoker's Dracula rescues the character from decades of campy interpretations—and features some terrific performances to boot." Metacritic, which uses a weighted average, assigned the film a score of 57 out of 100, based on 17 critics, indicating "mixed or average" reviews. Audiences polled by CinemaScore gave the film an average grade of "B−" on an A+ to F scale.

Vincent Canby described the film as having been created with the "enthusiasm of a precocious film student who has magically acquired a master's command of his craft." Richard Corliss said, "Coppola brings the old spook story alive [...] Everyone knows that Dracula has a heart; Coppola knows that it is more than an organ to drive a stake into. To the director, the count is a restless spirit who has been condemned for too many years to interment in cruddy movies. This luscious film restores the creature's nobility and gives him peace." Alan Jones in Radio Times said, "Eerie, romantic and operatic, this exquisitely mounted revamp of the undead legend is a supreme artistic achievement [...] as the tired count who has overdosed on immortality, Gary Oldman's towering performance holds centre stage and burns itself into the memory."

Roger Ebert awarded the film 3 out of 4 stars, writing, "I enjoyed the movie simply for the way it looked and felt. Production designers Dante Ferretti and Thomas Sanders have outdone themselves. The cinematographer, Michael Ballhaus, gets into the spirit so completely he always seems to light with shadows." Ebert did, however, voice criticisms over the film's "narrative confusions and dead ends". Jonathan Rosenbaum said the film suffered from a "somewhat dispersed and overcrowded story line" but that it "remains fascinating and often affecting thanks to all its visual and conceptual energy." Kenneth Turan of the Los Angeles Times called the film "not particularly scary, not very sexy and dramatically over the top", criticizing the tone and several of the casting decisions. Tom Hibbert of Empire was unimpressed. Awarding the film 2 out of 5 stars, he said, "Has a film ever promised so much yet delivered so little? [...] all we're left with is an overly long bloated adaptation, instead of what might have been a gothic masterpiece." Geoffrey O'Brien of The New York Review of Books also had reservations: "[T]he romantic make-over of Dracula registers as little more than a marketing device designed to exploit the attractiveness of the movie's youthful cast [...] [it] rolls on a patina of the 'feel-good' uplift endemic in recent Hollywood movies."

==== Reeves' performance ====
Empire's Tom Hibbert criticized Keanu Reeves's casting and was not the only critic to consider the resultant performance to be weak. In a career retrospective compiled by Entertainment Weekly, Reeves was described as having been "out of his depth" and "frequently blasted off the screen by Gary Oldman". Total Film writer Nathan Ditum included Reeves in his 2010 countdown of "The 29 Worst Movie Miscastings", describing him as "a dreary, milky nothing [...] a black hole of sex and drama". Josh Winning, also of Total Film, said that Reeves's work spoiled the movie. He mentioned it in a 2011 list of the "50 Performances That Ruined Movies", and wrote: "You can visibly see Keanu attempting not to end every one of his lines with 'dude'. The result? A performance that looks like the young actor's perpetually constipated. Painful for all parties." A feature by AskMen, called "Acting Miscasts That Ruined Movies", expressed a similar sentiment: "It's one thing to cast Keanu Reeves as an esteemed British lawyer, but it's quite another to ask him to act alongside Gary Oldman and Anthony Hopkins. The two Oscar nominees ran circles around the poor Canuck, exposing his lack of range, shoddy accent and abysmal instincts for all to see."

Reeves's attempt at London vernacular has been cited as one of the worst accents, if not the worst, in the history of recorded film. Virgin Media journalist Limara Salt, in listing the "Top 10 worst movie accents", wrote: "Keanu Reeves is consistently terrible at delivering any accent apart from Californian surfer dude but it's his English effort in Dracula that tops the lot. Overly posh and entirely ridiculous, Reeves's performance is as painful as it is hilarious." Salt said that Winona Ryder is "equally rubbish", an opinion echoed by Glen Levy in Time. In his "Top 10 Worst Fake British Accents", he said that both actors "come up short in the accent (and, some might argue, acting) department", and that their London dialect made for "a literal horror show". Conversely, Marc Savlov, writing for The Austin Chronicle, opined that Ryder was more impressive than Reeves and suited the role: "Ryder, seemingly the perfect choice for Dracula's obscure object of desire, Mina Harker, is better by far than Reeves".

=== Box office ===
Bram Stoker's Dracula opened at number one at the US box office with a November record of $30,521,679, beating Back to the Future Part II. This record was quickly surpassed by Home Alone 2: Lost in New York. The film dropped off in subsequent weeks, losing 50.8% of its audience after its first weekend in release and exiting the top five after three weeks. It became a box-office hit, grossing $82,522,790 in the United States and Canada, becoming the 15th-highest-grossing film of the year. The film set an opening weekend record in the United Kingdom of $4 million, beating the record set by Batman Returns. It also held the record for having the biggest opening weekend for an 18 certificate film until 1997 when Alien Resurrection surpassed it. Internationally, the film grossed another $133,339,902 for a total worldwide gross of $215,862,692, making it the ninth-highest-grossing film of the year worldwide.

As of 2023, adjusted for inflation, Bram Stoker's Dracula's box office is $473.5 million, making it one of the highest-grossing vampire movies of all time.

=== Awards and nominations ===
Award	Category	Recipient(s)	Result	Ref.
Academy Awards	Best Art Direction	Thomas E. Sanders; Garrett Lewis	Nominated	
Academy Awards	Best Costume Design	Eiko Ishioka	Won	
Academy Awards	Best Makeup	Greg Cannom; Michèle Burke; Matthew W. Mungle	Won	
Academy Awards	Best Sound Editing	Tom McCarthy; David E. Stone	Won	
British Academy Film Awards	Best Costume Design	Eiko Ishioka	Nominated	
British Academy Film Awards	Best Makeup and Hair	Greg Cannom; Michèle Burke; Matthew W. Mungle	Nominated	
British Academy Film Awards	Best Production Design	Thomas E. Sanders	Nominated	
British Academy Film Awards	Best Special Visual Effects	Roman Coppola; Gary Gutierrez; Michael Lantieri; Gene Warren Jr.	Nominated	
Chicago Film Critics Association Awards	Best Cinematography	Michael Ballhaus	Won	
Fangoria Chainsaw Awards	Best Studio/Big-Budget Film		Won	
Fangoria Chainsaw Awards	Best Actor	Gary Oldman	Won	
Fangoria Chainsaw Awards	Best Actress	Winona Ryder	Nominated	
Fangoria Chainsaw Awards	Best Supporting Actor	Anthony Hopkins	Won	
Fangoria Chainsaw Awards	Best Supporting Actress	Sadie Frost	Nominated	
Fangoria Chainsaw Awards	Best Screenplay	James V. Hart	Won	
Fangoria Chainsaw Awards	Best Makeup Effects	Greg Cannom	Won	
Fangoria Chainsaw Awards	Best Soundtrack	Wojciech Kilar	Won	
Hugo Awards	Best Dramatic Presentation	Francis Ford Coppola (director); James V. Hart (screenplay); Bram Stoker (original novel)	Nominated	
MTV Movie Awards	Best Kiss	Winona Ryder & Gary Oldman	Nominated	
Saturn Awards	Best Horror Film		Won	
Saturn Awards	Best Director	Francis Ford Coppola	Won	
Saturn Awards	Best Actor	Gary Oldman	Won	
Saturn Awards	Best Actress	Winona Ryder	Nominated	
Saturn Awards	Best Supporting Actor	Anthony Hopkins	Nominated	
Saturn Awards	Best Writing	James V. Hart	Won	
Saturn Awards	Best Costume Design	Eiko Ishioka	Won	
Saturn Awards	Best Make-up	Greg Cannom; Matthew W. Mungle; Michèle Burke	Nominated	
Saturn Awards	Best Music	Wojciech Kilar	Nominated	
Saturn Awards	Best Special Effects	Roman Coppola	Nominated	

== Soundtrack ==
Bram Stoker's Dracula: Original Motion Picture Soundtrack

Film score by Wojciech Kilar
- Released: November 24, 1992
- Length: 54:59
- Label: Columbia Records

In 2018, the soundtrack had a 3-CD set Limited Edition re-release: Disc One and Two of this re-issue presented the premiere of Kilar's "composed score", his music as originally written for the film. Disc Two also featured a bounty of alternate bonus cues from this material. Disc Three showcases the original 1992 album assembly, remastered, with additional bonus tracks.

== Home media ==
In 1993, the film received both a standard VHS release and a limited edition VHS release, the latter being a box set in the shape of a coffin. The limited edition release contained the film on VHS, which included a behind-the-scenes documentary, and the original Dracula novel by Bram Stoker in paperback. Grey, gothic statue heads (as seen on the original film poster) adorned the front cover of the book against a gray stone background. That same year, the Criterion Collection released a special edition LaserDisc of the film.

Dracula was first released to DVD in 1999 and again as a Superbit DVD in 2001. The DVD included several extra features: filmographies, the original theatrical trailer, a documentary (Dracula: The Man, The Myth, The Legend), costume designs, and DVD trailers. The Superbit version did not contain any extra features.

A two-disc Collector's Edition DVD and Blu-ray was released in 2007. Special features include an introduction and audio commentary by director Francis Ford Coppola, deleted and extended scenes, teaser and full-length trailers, and the documentaries "The Blood Is the Life: The Making of Dracula", "The Costumes Are the Sets: The Design of Eiko Ishioka", "In Camera: The Naïve Visual Effects of Dracula", and "Method and Madness: Visualizing Dracula".

A 4K release was put out in 2017, sourced from a new scan of the original negatives.

== Merchandise ==
A novelization of the film was published, written by Fred Saberhagen. A four-issue comic book adaptation and 100 collectible cards based on the movie were released by Topps Comics, with art provided by Mike Mignola and a full script provided by Roy Thomas, using dialogue derived almost entirely from the film's script. In 2018, IDW Publishing collected all four issues and released them in a trade paperback. Various action figures and model sets were also produced. In addition to these items, accurate licensed replicas of Dracula's sword and Quincey's Bowie knife were available from Factory X. Other merchandising for the film included a board game; a pinball machine, which was also adapted as a digital pinball game and re-released as downloadable content for The Pinball Arcade until June 30, 2018; and video game adaptations for various platforms.

In 2021, Funko Pop vinyl figures from the film were announced for release: Van Helsing and three different versions of Dracula (in his old form, his young form in gray suit and top hat, and as Vlad Tepes in red armor). Thus, the film became the third live-action adaptation of Dracula that got Funko POPs (previous ones were Nosferatu, based on the 1922 film, and Dracula, based on the 1931 film).

== Legacy ==
The film had a considerable effect on popular culture and vampire representation in media. Costume design by Eiko Ishioka created a new image for the Count and for the first time freed him from the black cape and evening wear the character had become associated with since Bela Lugosi's portrayal in 1931. The film was also a landmark in vampire horror as it is the first vampire film and the only Dracula adaptation to win Oscars.

The film is seen as a game changer by many critics, which established a tone and style that redefined cinematic vampires. It created a host of new vampire film tropes, like retractable fangs, vampires turning into literal bat-men, and a steampunk aesthetic. Author Bruce Scivally states, "Bram Stoker's Dracula is significant in the way that The Exorcist and The Shining were significant, in showing that a horror story can be worthy of an A-list cast and production values, and that a truly imaginative filmmaker can take even a story as hoary as Dracula and give it a new luster."

Coppola's film began a cycle of prestige monster movies with big stars and name directors, as well as high production values and lavish costumes: Mary Shelley's Frankenstein (1994), directed by Kenneth Branagh and starring Robert De Niro as Frankenstein's Monster; Wolf (1994), directed by Mike Nichols and starring Jack Nicholson as a werewolf; and Mary Reilly (1996), directed by Stephen Frears, and starring John Malkovich as Dr. Jekyll and Mr. Hyde and Julia Roberts as a maid who develops a crush on the mad doctor and his crooked other self. Coppola's film also influenced the next major vampire movie/literary adaptation: in 1994, Interview with the Vampire, directed by Neil Jordan, was released starring Tom Cruise as Lestat de Lioncourt, Brad Pitt as Louis, and Kirsten Dunst as Claudia. According to Jordan: "Up to that point, Francis Ford Coppola with Bram Stoker's Dracula, he introduced opulence and theatricality. Normally, before that one, I always thought of vampire movies as cheap, cobbled together, brilliant use of minimal resources. Francis made it this epic, didn't he? So when I was given the opportunity to make Interview with the Vampire, I thought, 'Oh, it would be really great to expand on that epic sense of darkness and to give these characters huge, kind of romantic destinies and longings and feelings.'"

The film was included in Entertainment Weekly's "5 best vampire movies", Esquire's "20 Best Vampire Movies" and "Sexiest Horror Movies Ever Made", IndieWire's "The 100 Best Horror Movies of All Time" and "The 12 Best Vampire Movies Ever Made". Oldman's Dracula featured in Forbes's list of "Hollywood's Most Powerful Vampires", as well as The Guardian's "10 best screen vampires". He also was ranked as best version of Dracula by Screen Rant. In honor of Syfy's 25th anniversary in 2017, the channel compiled "25 greatest" lists celebrating the last 25 years of all science fiction, fantasy, and horror; Oldman's Dracula was included in "The 25 Greatest Movie Performances from the Last 25 years".

- The Action-Adventure gothic horror video game series Castlevania (Castlevania first released in 1986 with its first video game, 6 years before the movie), resembles the film in several parts. In the game Lament of Innocence (2003)—the origins of the series' premise—Mathias Cronqvist, the man who would be Dracula after the death of his wife, Elisabetha, sought vengeance against God for her death and turned into a vampire, betraying Leon Belmont in the process and igniting the centuries-old war between the Belmonts and Count Dracula. In the game Symphony of the Night (1997) [the plot of the game chronologically takes place much later than in Lament of Innocence in 1797] appeared another character, Lisa, second wife of Dracula and mother of his son Alucard. Lisa is killed in the year 1475, accused of being a witch. This kickstarts the events of Castlevania III: Dracula's Curse, released in 1989, a year later. She was killed and her death sent Dracula into rage and bloody revenge against humanity. Lisa is the spitting image of Elisabetha Cronqvist; her name is also the short form of the name Elisabetha.
- Fox's comedy series In Living Color's December 1992 skit "Bram Stoker's Wanda" spoofs the film, with Jim Carrey playing Dracula.
- The 1993 Simpsons episode "Treehouse of Horror IV" had a segment titled "Bart Simpson's Dracula" which is a parody of this film with Mr. Burns as a vampire.
- Japanese manga and anime series Hellsing resembles the film: the backstory of Alucard (Count Dracula turned vampire slayer in the Hellsing's Universe) in manga includes him sailing to England in search of his love reborn and also makes the direct connection in anime between Alucard (Count Dracula) and Vlad the Impaler.
- In Anno Dracula, an alternative history novel series by Kim Newman, where Count Dracula won and spread vampirism across the world—in Dracula Cha Cha Cha, Count Dracula's first wife is mentioned as "Elisabeta of Transylvania"; the name was taken from this film version (Vlad the Impaler's first wife's name is unknown historically).
- Vampires: The World of the Undead (original title: Sang pour sang, le réveil des vampires, 1993), a nonfiction book by French vampire myth specialist Jean Marigny, is a reaction to Coppola's Dracula, published by Éditions Gallimard. After the film, media coverage around vampires was in full swing, and Gallimard, for their "Découvertes" collection, was looking for an author to write a book about vampires. After a few weeks of intensive work, the book came out in 1993 to match the release of the film in France.
- The score for The Wolfman (2010) has similarity to Wojciech Kilar’s 1992 score for the film. In interviews, Danny Elfman admitted that he was inspired by Kilar’s music, and was attempting to recapture the sense of romantic classicism and lush horror that Francis Ford Coppola’s film contained.
- What We Do in the Shadows (2014) heavily references this film. Jemaine Clement based his performance as Vladislav on Gary Oldman's portrayal. What We Do in the Shadows (2019) has a vampire character Baron Afanas (played by Doug Jones), who is also partly inspired by Oldman's Dracula. The TV series also has a plotline where vampire Nadja meets a reincarnation of her past lover and says she crossed oceans of time to be with him.
- Mexican film director Guillermo del Toro had props from this film as part of his At Home With Monsters public exhibition, including the red Dracula helmet from the prologue of the film. The exhibition toured US and Canada.
- Jessica Chastain said that she incorporated some inspiration from her younger days into her acting (and wardrobe) as Lucille Sharpe in gothic romance film Crimson Peak (2015): "My friend and I used Dracula as our reference—the one with Gary Oldman; we were Winona Ryder and Sadie Frost, she wore black lipstick and I wore a black-red lip color, like dried blood almost."
- Stranger Things season two episode "Chapter Two: Trick or Treat, Freak" (2017) has a scene where Joyce Byers (Winona Ryder) celebrates Halloween with her boyfriend Bob Newby (Sean Astin) dressed as Dracula; the couple share a dance together as an homage to the film. Jamie Campbell Bower used Gary Oldman's Dracula among the influences for his performance of antagonist Vecna in seasons 4-5 of the series.
- This movie was one of the major influences on the dark fantasy adventure film The Green Knight (2021) by David Lowery. According to Lowery this was one of his all-time favorite films, and he paid homage to it when St. Winifred first approaches Gawain in her cottage.
- The Academy Award-winning movie Poor Things (2023) by Yorgos Lanthimos was heavily influenced by this movie and used it as one of the main inspirations and references.
- Beetlejuice Beetlejuice (2024), directed by Tim Burton, introduced similar character dynamics for the characters of Betelgeuse, Lydia Deetz (Winona Ryder), and Delores (Monica Bellucci) to Oldman's Dracula, Ryder's Mina, and Bellucci's bride in the movie. Much like in Bram Stoker's Dracula, Ryder's Lydia is the mortal woman whom the horror movie's supernatural and deceased villain Betelgeuse is obsessed with, and even keeps her photo as a token of his obsession. Likewise, both Bellucci's undead soul-sucker ex-wife of Betelgeuse Delores and Dracula's vampire bride are both the dead wife/bride of the main villain, with the villain not caring about her, but about the human woman instead. At the end of the movie, Lydia (seemingly) even takes her daughter Astrid (Jenna Ortega) on a trip to Dracula's Castle in Romania, where Astrid takes a liking to a Dracula-performer-employee called "Vlad".
- American mystery film Wake Up Dead Man (marketed as Wake Up Dead Man: A Knives Out Mystery) (2025), written and directed by Rian Johnson, used this movie as influence on one of the key scenes, where Grace Wicks is destroying the church in a rampage.
- American satirical surrealist psychological slasher film Teenage Sex and Death at Camp Miasma (2026), directed by Jane Schoenbrun, used this movie as point of reference, particularly for its Gothic, romantic quality and use of matte paintings.
- The objects from the film are part of "Horror Show" exhibition at the Academy Museum of Motion Pictures, which is set to open in September 2026. They are on display in the Gothic chamber of exhibition, which is dedicated to Gothic horror and exploration of the darker edges of the human experience.

== See also ==
- List of cult films
- Bram Stoker's Dracula (1974), a previous adaptation of the same name combining Vlad the Impaler with a reincarnated lost love
- Vampire film
- Mary Shelley's Frankenstein (1994)
