= Shambling Towards Hiroshima =

2009 novella by James K. Morrow

"Shambling Towards Hiroshima" is a 2009 alternate history/science fiction novella by James K. Morrow, about kaiju. It was first published by Tachyon Publications.

== Synopsis ==
In 1945, while the US Army is running the Manhattan Project, the US Navy is running "Project Knickerbocker": the creation of giant firebreathing lizards which will attack Japan. In order to convince Japanese authorities that this is possible, and thereby scare them into surrendering, a demonstration is arranged in which the juvenile lizards will destroy a miniature Japanese city — however, the juveniles are too docile, and therefore actor Syms Thorsley is secretly recruited to portray "Gorgantis". Decades later, Thorsley reflects on how this affected his life.

== Reception ==
Shambling Towards Hiroshima won the 2010 Theodore Sturgeon Award, and was a finalist for the Nebula Award for Best Novella of 2009 and the 2010 Hugo Award for Best Novella.

Kirkus Reviews stated that it was "sharp-edged (and) delightfully batty" and [p]reposterous but somehow almost plausible", praising Morrow's use of historical figures as characters. Publishers Weekly found it to be "witty and touching", with characters who are "fascinating and real".

Strange Horizons considered it "witty (and) playful", and an "entertaining piece of whimsy" which avoids a "misguided detour into portentous and melodramatic territory" at its conclusion, but noted that "none of the jokes in [the story] are quite as inspired as the central conceit itself", and faulted the heavy use of historical references, which "occasionally create[s] the unnerving feeling that it is intended as a prolonged in-joke". At the SF Site, Paul Kincaid called it "a slight novel clearly written for absurd effect", and observed that it could be considered a "curious example of cultural appropriation", in that "everything associated with one of the most singular Japanese responses to the atomic bomb is [within Shambling Towards Hiroshima, presented as] the creation of America" and as a result, "Japan is somehow not even being allowed its own response to its own catastrophe"; nonetheless, Kincaid concluded that when viewed as "a satire on the American military mind and the cheaper aspects of American popular culture", the novel is "a very funny book indeed. Just don't try to peer too far below the surface."
