= Joe Adamson =

Author

Joe Adamson is an author of several books, including:

- Groucho, Harpo, Chico and Sometimes Zeppo: A History of the Marx Brothers and a Satire on the Rest of the World
- Tex Avery, King of Cartoons
- Bugs Bunny: 50 Years and Only One Grey Hare
- The Walter Lantz Story

Adamson's book on the Marx Brothers is widely considered one of the most important books written about the team.
