= Seven Songs for Malcolm X =

British documentary film

Seven Songs for Malcolm x
- Directed by: John Akomfrah
- Written by: John Akomfrah
- Produced by: Lina Gopaul
- Cinematography: Arthur Jafa
- Release dates: 15 September 1993 (Toronto); 15 March 2009

Seven Songs for Malcolm X is a British documentary film about the life of Malcolm X, the influential civil rights activist who was assassinated in 1965. The film was written and directed by John Akomfrah, with co-writer Edward George, and produced by Lina Gopaul. The Black Audio Film Collective, Akomfrah's London-based company, and Channel 4 Television Corporation were both involved in the production of the film. It was first aired at the Toronto Festival of Festivals in Canada, on 15 September 1993, and then at the Chicago International Film Festival in October 1993. On 15 March 2009, it was released in the Czech Republic at the One World Film Festival. The film was distributed by Channel 4 Television Company. It was filmed in London and has a runtime of 52 minutes.

== Content ==
The film pays homage to the life and the legacy of the African-American activist Malcolm X through a series of narrations and dramatic reenactments. The narrations are conducted by members of Malcolm X's family, former aides, eyewitnesses, scholars of history, social analysts and quotations from Malcolm X's autobiography.

The film begins with narration from Cocoa Fusco saying, "FBI report June 12, 1964; anonymous called at 1:40 says Malcolm X will be bumped off". This is followed by several quotes from Malcolm X, as well as picture of each person who will speak throughout the film. Then attorney William Kunstler says: "I met him just a week or so before he died at an airport and he told me that he had had a telephone call with Martin Luther King Jr. and they were going to meet and try to amalgamate their two forces...divide the country into north and south, Martin in the south and Malcolm in the north. It would have been a great movement with the two charismatic men. And I think that the government had to stop that at any cost." This leads into further eye-witness accounts of the day that Malcolm X died, by community activist Yuri Kochiyama, Malcolm X's wife, Betty Shabazz, and one of his aides, Imam Benjamin Karim.

Then several people including filmmaker Spike Lee, cultural critic Greg Tate, and Professor of Law Patricia Williams speak of Malcolm X. The camera then screens in Malcolm X's tomb, which reads:

Hajj-Malik El Shabazz
Malcolm X
1925–1965

=== The Seventh Child ===
This is the first of several chapter titles in the film. It begins with the history of Malcolm X's family. His mother, Louise Norton, moved from the Caribbean to the United States of America, and the film states that this was because she "believed in the delicate line between life and death, the line of color". This sets the stage for the explanation of Malcolm X's motivation for becoming an activist. Wilfred Little, his brother, says that "understanding the family's background is important in understanding Malcolm, because the family were always activists". He further describes the two activists admired by his father, Earl Little - Marcus Garvey and Booker T. Washington. The narrator then reveals that Louise and Earl were members of Marcus Garvey's United Negro Improvement Association, formed in 1914 to promote unity among people of African descent.

Author Thulani Davis speaks of the events that shaped Malcolm X, such as the Ku Klux Klan telling Earl Little to quit preaching Marcus Garvey's message, and when Earl did not listen he was murdered. This led to Louise losing her mind due to the stress of attempting to maintain their house, and eventually being placed in a mental institution, with Malcolm X and his siblings being sent to foster homes. Another significant event presented is the moment when Malcolm X lost interest in school, with his dream of becoming a lawyer being shot down by his teachers telling him that "wanting to become a lawyer isn’t a realistic goal for a nigger".

=== The Seven Years in Seventh Heaven ===
The film then moves to Malcolm X's teenage years, when after moving from foster home to foster home he went to Boston to live with his half-sister Ella at the age of thirteen. These were Malcolm X's zoot suit, wide-rimmed hat, knob-toed shoes, and big-legged pants days. Malcolm Jarvis (aka "Shorty"), one of Malcolm's childhood friends, describes meeting Malcolm in a pool hall, and says that his first impression of Malcolm was that he was a "slickster from the yard". Robin Kelley, Professor in the Department of History at the University of Michigan, describes this as a period of darkness prior to the transformation to Islam, with that the zoot suit representing a political statement that Malcolm X was not willing to participate in the war or suggesting a sense of anti-patriotism.

Quoting The Autobiography of Malcolm X, the narrator reveals that when Malcolm X was arrested, he told the police: "I can’t wait to get me a gun so I can shoot me some crackers!" Malcolm Jarvis then describes breaking into the house of James Gamble, of Procter & Gamble, while he was out of town.

=== Phantoms of History I ===
The film speaks about the ending of World War II, at about the time that Malcolm X entered prison. Wilfred Little describes the conversation he had with Malcolm X, telling him that he should finish school in prison so that "the time would serve him". Malcolm Jarvis describes their studies in mental telepathy, and says it has to do with Malcolm X's transformation of the mind. He implies that Malcolm X knew how to manipulate the minds of others.

Wilfred Little discusses his own transformation to Islam and his desire to share his religion with Malcolm X and his other siblings. He speaks of how stubborn Malcolm X was, and how he sent their brother Reginald to the prison to speak to Malcolm X. Reginald was the one who convinced Malcolm to convert to Islam while in prison, a transformation that marked the turning point in his life.

=== Phantoms of History II ===
The narrator then describes the year 1952, which was the first year in which no lynchings had occurred. The narrator reveals that at this period in time, Martin Luther King Jr. believed that "non-violence is a sham". This is the period of Malcolm X's life after he has left prison. Malcolm X meets Elijah Muhammad, the founder of the Nation of Islam, who becomes like a father figure to Malcolm X. Betty Shabazz, Malcolm X's wife, describes the relationship of the two men as that of a father and a son. She says that Muhammad actually referred to Malcolm X as "son", which she believed to be important to Malcolm X, since he lost his father at the age of six. It was when Malcolm X met Elijah Muhammad that he received his honorary "X". Before that, he was simply "Malcolm".

=== The Hour of the New Negro ===
Betty Shabazz describes the formation of temples around the world that were populated by young adults. She says that before Malcolm X started this movement, there were less than six temples full of elderly people and Malcolm helped to transform it. Hassan El-Sayeed, a community activist in Harlem, describes African square in Harlem and speaks of where Malcolm X preached and lived.

=== Phantoms of History III ===
The narrator reveals that in 1957, Martin Luther King Jr. became the leading proponent in the non-violence movement. Betty Shabazz describes meeting Malcolm X for the first time. She says that he frightened her at first, because he always seemed so serious and focused.

=== Now’s the Time ===
The film details how on 14 April 1957, Malcolm X intervened in Hinton Johnson's arrest. Hassan El-Sayeed describes the 28th Precinct, where Johnson was held after being beaten. He says that Malcolm X brought several hundred members of the Nation of Islam, who eagerly awaited his orders. Imam Benjamin Karim claims that after the neurosurgeon told Malcolm X that Johnson would live, he simply raised his hands and the crowd melted away. Karim says that a police officer remarked, "No man should have that much power."

Coco Fusco reads the FBI files, revealing that they now acknowledged that Malcolm X should be viewed as a key figure because of his extensive activity of Mosque No. 7. Betty Shabazz says that his success was because of his hard work. On 3 June 1963, FBI reports revealed that technical surveillance was installed in Malcolm X's home. This leads into quotes from Malcolm X's biographer, Peter Goldman, and historian John Henrik Clarke. The film reveals that Malcolm X was becoming aware that his friends wanted to kill him.

=== The Hours of the Knife ===
When broadcasters announced that President John F. Kennedy had died, Malcolm X stated that it was a case of "the chickens coming home to roost". Elijah Muhammad used this statement from Malcolm X to silence him for 90 days. Elijah Muhammad told the members of the Nation of Islam that if Malcolm X came back to Chicago, they must only give him a job washing dishes.

=== The Hour of Revolution ===
The film describes Malcolm X's realisation that he could work better by being on the outside of the Nation of Islam. It quotes him as saying, "I will work with them or against them, whichever works better." Further quotes from Malcolm X reveal that he planned to go to Mecca to give himself a direct link to Islam.

=== Phantoms of History IV ===
The film goes on to explain how Gabriel Prasa joined the Nation of Islam, after discovering that he had been bombing Africans in the military. A group of people came to him wanting to purchase weapons because they had a problem with Malcolm X.

Malcolm X wrote to Yuri Kochiyama as he traveled around the world, and received a promise from the United Nations that they would address the mistreatment of Negroes as a human rights issue and not a civil rights issue. According to Wilfred Little, Malcolm X was told on one of his trips that he had changed the image of Muhammad, he had caused people to sacrifice their money and their daughters, and that he was going to have to pay for his mistakes. Cocoa Fusco reveals that the order to kill Malcolm X came from Chicago on 5 July 1964.

A. Peter Bailey discussed the formation of the Organization of Afro-American Unity with Malcolm X.

=== The End is Nigh ===
Malcolm X is heard on the film, speaking about his house being bombed and almost hitting his three daughters. The film then shows screenshots of newspaper articles from the day that Malcolm X was murdered. It also shows his funeral, and the thousands of people mourning his death. Hassan El-Sayeed visited the Unity Funeral Home in the centre of Harlem and spoke about the impact of Malcolm X, saying that "the name is what Malcolm was about in his last days".

The film then moves to the release of Spike Lee's Malcolm X, starring Denzel Washington, in Harlem in 1992. The film ends with a quote from Jan Carew saying that Malcolm X was important because he was a "truth teller", who told the truth without coating the truth.
