= FashFilmFete =

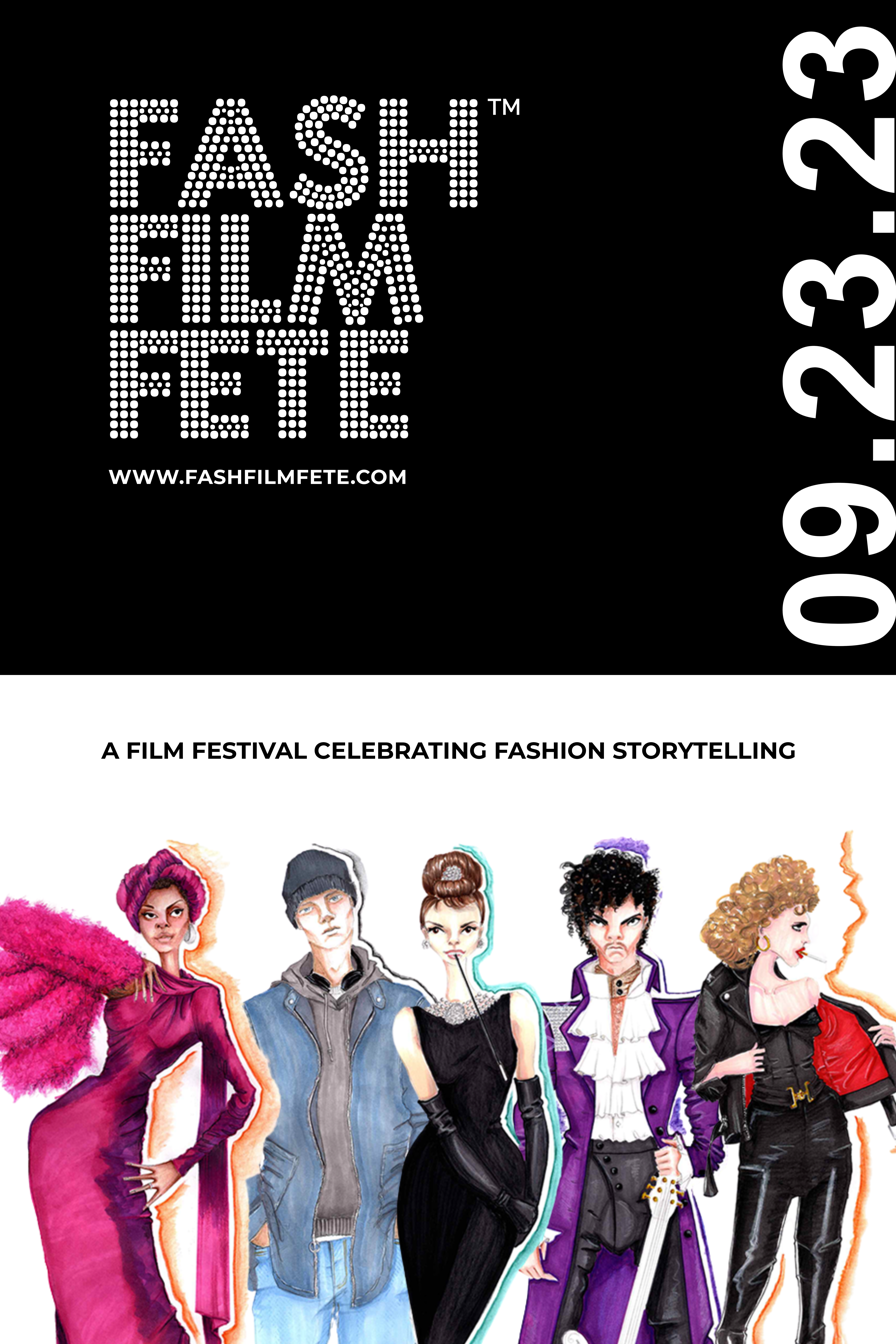
Annual FashFilmFete in Phoenix, Arizona

FashFilmFete (FFF) is an American fashion film festival held annually at the Phoenix Art Museum in Phoenix, Arizona since 2022.

== History ==
The first annual event was held April 30, 2022 featuring the 1975 feature film Mahogany starring Diana Ross, as the showcase film and was recognized for its trendsetting costumes, which were designed by Ross. FFF received 46 submissions and 13 film awards in its first year including "Mrs. G," a documentary produced in Israel about Lea Gottlieb, founder of Gottex swimwear, which won 1st Place Best Documentary, the top award, at the inaugural festival.

For the second annual event on Sept. 23, 2023, FFF showcased "Happy Clothes" a documentary about award-winning costume designer Patricia Field known for the HBO series Sex and the City as well as the film The Devil Wears Prada. Introduced by the film's director Michael Selditch, FFF was the second festival in North America to screen the documentary after Tribeca Festival.

In 2023, the festival presented the inaugural Costume Design Career Achievement Awards, recognizing Ruth E. Carter for her works in films such as Black Panther, Selma and Malcolm X; and Patricia Field for her works in television including Ugly Betty, Younger and Emily in Paris.

The emerging festival also held a two-week online festival in 2023 in partnership with Filmocracy, including a directory for film and fashion professionals.
