= Arnold Perl =

American dramatist (1914–1971)

- Born: April 14, 1914
- Died: December 11, 1971 (aged 57); New York City, US
- Occupations: Playwright, screenwriter, television producer, television writer
- Years active: 1949–1971
- Spouse: Nancy Ann Reals
- Children: 5

Arnold Perl (April 14, 1914 – December 11, 1971) was an American playwright, screenwriter, television producer and television writer of Jewish origin.

== Biography ==
Perl was born and raised in New York. He began his career by working in advertising, editing, and writing copy for a literary agency. In the late 1930s he was acting executive director of Frontier Films, Incorporated. His early work included the documentaries Return to Life and China Strikes Back, the first films about Spain and Chinese guerillas, respectively.

Perl briefly attended Cornell University, but did not graduate. When World War II began he became the United Nations Information Office's radio officer. In that role he worked as liaison between 25 foreign governments and radio outlets. In addition to those duties he wrote the Uncle Sam series for the United Nations program and was a consultant to the War Department.

After his October 1943 induction into the Army, Perl worked in an orientation program with wounded soldiers at Halloran Hospital. After that he went to the Army Service Forces Productions Unit, doing research and consulting on Assignment Home. Then he began producing the Weapons For Victory program.

Radio programs that broadcast episodes using scripts that Perl wrote included Bulldog Drummond, Grand Central Station, and Inner Sanctum. He had written for the television series The Big Story, Naked City, The Doctors and the Nurses, East Side/West Side and N.Y.P.D., which he created with David Susskind.

Perl first made a name for himself in the mid-1950s when he published three one-act plays based on works by Sholem Aleichem, who died in 1916 ("A Tale of Schelm", "Bontche Schweig", and "The High School"), which he published under the title The World of Sholom Aleichem which dealt with the life of Russian Jews. This Perl work also features the character Tevye, the milkman, who was finally memorialized in 1964 with the musical Fiddler on the Roof. Perl's play premiered at the Carnegie Hall Playhouse in January 1957 and received good reviews. Until modern times, Tevye's story is performed on Broadway under the title Fiddler on the Roof with the suffix "Sholem Aleichem's stories used by special permission of Arnold Perl".

Perl also co-wrote the screenplay for Cotton Comes to Harlem (1970), actor Ossie Davis' film directing debut. Perl also wrote the play Tevye and his Daughters.

During the 1950s Perl married Nancy Ann Reals (1933–2018) after the pair met while working on a stage production of Perl's Sholem Aleicheim. The Perls spent their time between East Hampton and Manhattan.

At the time of Perl's death in 1971, he had been collaborating with James Baldwin on the documentary film Malcolm X (1972). Nancy took over the project as a producer, working with editor Mick Benderoth. Perl was nominated posthumously for the Academy Award for Best Documentary Feature for his work on the film in 1973. Perl's script for the film was later re-written by Spike Lee for his 1992 film on Malcolm X.

Years later, in 1990, Nancy Ann Reals Perl and Benderoth wed after forming a production company.

Perl had two daughters from his marriage with Reals and three children from an earlier marriage. He died on December 11, 1971, at his home in New York City, aged 58.
