= Malcolm X (1972 film) =

1972 American documentary film

- Theatrical release poster
- Directed by: Arnold Perl
- Written by: Alex Haley; Arnold Perl; Malcolm X
- Produced by: Mick Benderoth; Arnold Perl; Nancy Reals Perl; Marvin Worth
- Narrated by: James Earl Jones; Ossie Davis
- Distributed by: Warner Bros.
- Release date: May 24, 1972
- Running time: 91 minutes
- Country: United States
- Language: English

Malcolm X, also known as Malcolm X: His Own Story As It Really Happened, is a 1972 American documentary film directed by Arnold Perl. It is based on the 1965 book The Autobiography of Malcolm X.

== Production ==
Marvin Worth and Perl started working on Malcolm X in 1969, four years after the human rights activist's assassination. The pair initially intended for the film to be a drama, but in the end they made a documentary when some people close to Malcolm X refused to talk to them. Worth recalled in 1993, "I mostly went for the public figure, rather than the private man. I aimed for showing the evolution of the man and what he had to say. I wanted to do it with the public speeches."

Archival footage, newsreels and excerpts of speeches given by Malcolm were utilized in the film.

Betty Shabazz, Malcolm X's widow, served as a consultant to the film-makers. She was so pleased with the resulting film, she took her six daughters—who ranged in age from six to thirteen—to see it. Afterwards, one of them asked, "Daddy was everything to you, wasn't he?"

Perl died in 1971 while writing and collaborating with James Baldwin on the documentary film. Perl's wife Nancy took over the project as a producer, working with editor Mick Benderoth, and Perl was nominated posthumously for the Academy Award for Best Documentary Feature for his work on the film in 1973. Perl's script for the film was later re-written by Spike Lee for his 1992 film on Malcolm X.

== Reception ==
According to the Los Angeles Times, Malcolm X garnered "enthusiastic reviews". Time wrote:

For Warner Bros. to make a documentary about Malcolm X seems about as likely as for the D.A.R. to sponsor the Peking Ballet. That the film should come from such a source is the first surprise. The second is that it is good—a fair forum for Malcolm's fundamental ideas and an exceptional visual chronicle of how those ideas took shape.

In his review for The New York Times, Howard Thompson described it as "a generally rounded, often fascinating movie". Thompson also wrote that the film was "surprisingly balanced".

Jay Carr wrote in The Boston Globe in 1993 that Malcolm X was "essential viewing". William Hageman wrote in the Chicago Tribune in 2011 that the documentary "does a better job of capturing the times" than Spike Lee's 1992 Malcolm X.

=== Accolades ===
The film was nominated for an Academy Award for Best Documentary Feature.

== Home media ==
Malcolm X was released on DVD in 2005 as bonus material with the two-disc special edition of Lee's film. In 2012, it was issued on Blu-ray Disc as part of the Blu-ray 20th-anniversary edition of Lee's film.

== See also ==
- Civil rights movement in popular culture
- King: A Filmed Record... Montgomery to Memphis - 1970 Oscar-nominated documentary this time focusing on Martin Luther King Jr.
- I Am Not Your Negro - 2016 Oscar-nominated film essay documentary based on James Baldwin's unfinished memoir
