= 2019 Seattle Film Critics Society Awards =

Annual US film awards ceremony

4th Seattle Film Critics Society Awards
- Date: December 16, 2019
- Site: Seattle, Washington

Highlights
- Best Picture: Parasite
- Most awards: Parasite (4)
- Most nominations: The Irishman (10)

The 4th Seattle Film Critics Society Awards were announced on December 16, 2019.

The nominations were announced on December 9, 2019.

== Winners and nominees ==
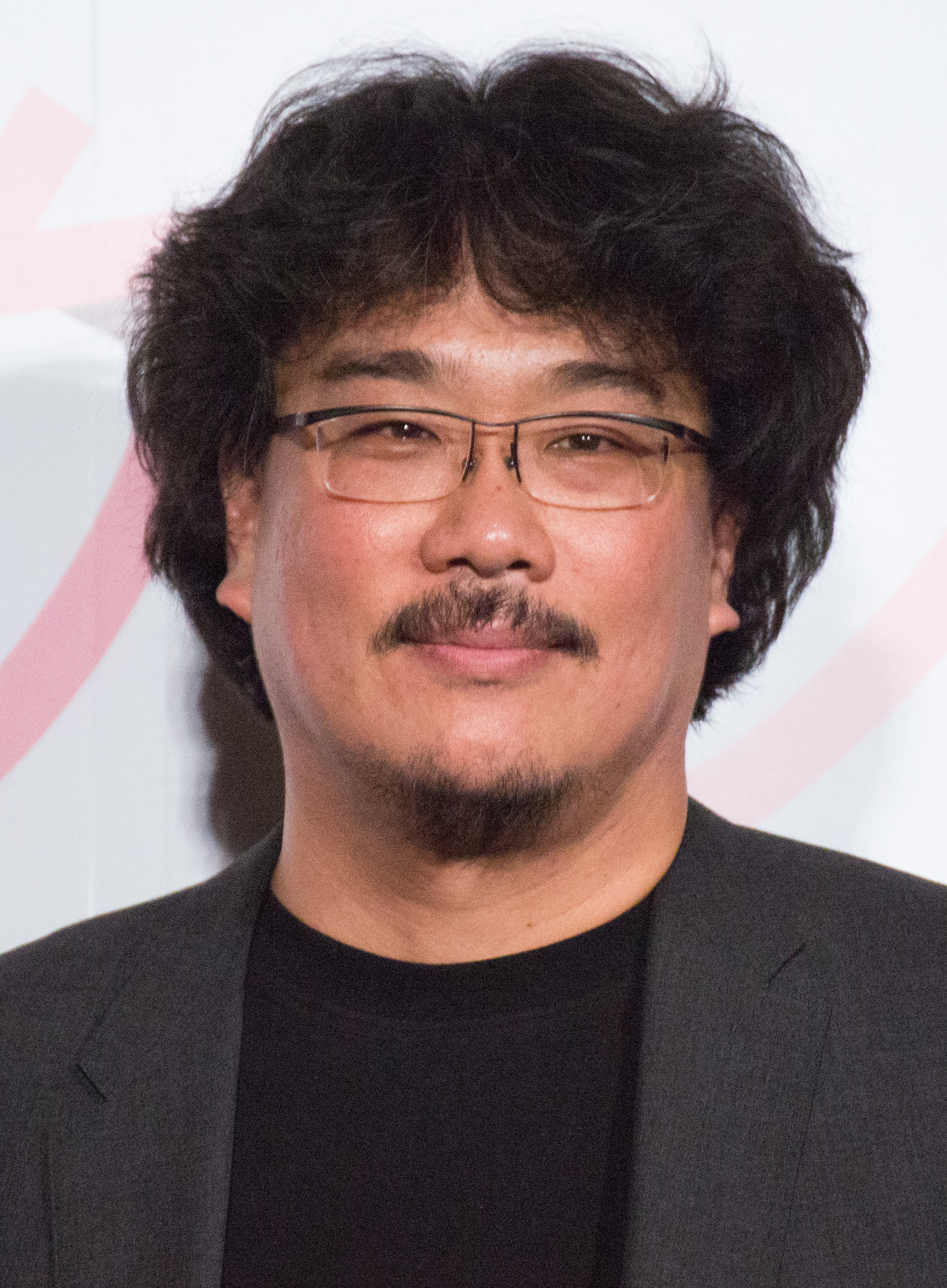
Bong Joon-ho, Best Director winner, Best Screenplay co-winner and Best Foreign Language Film winner

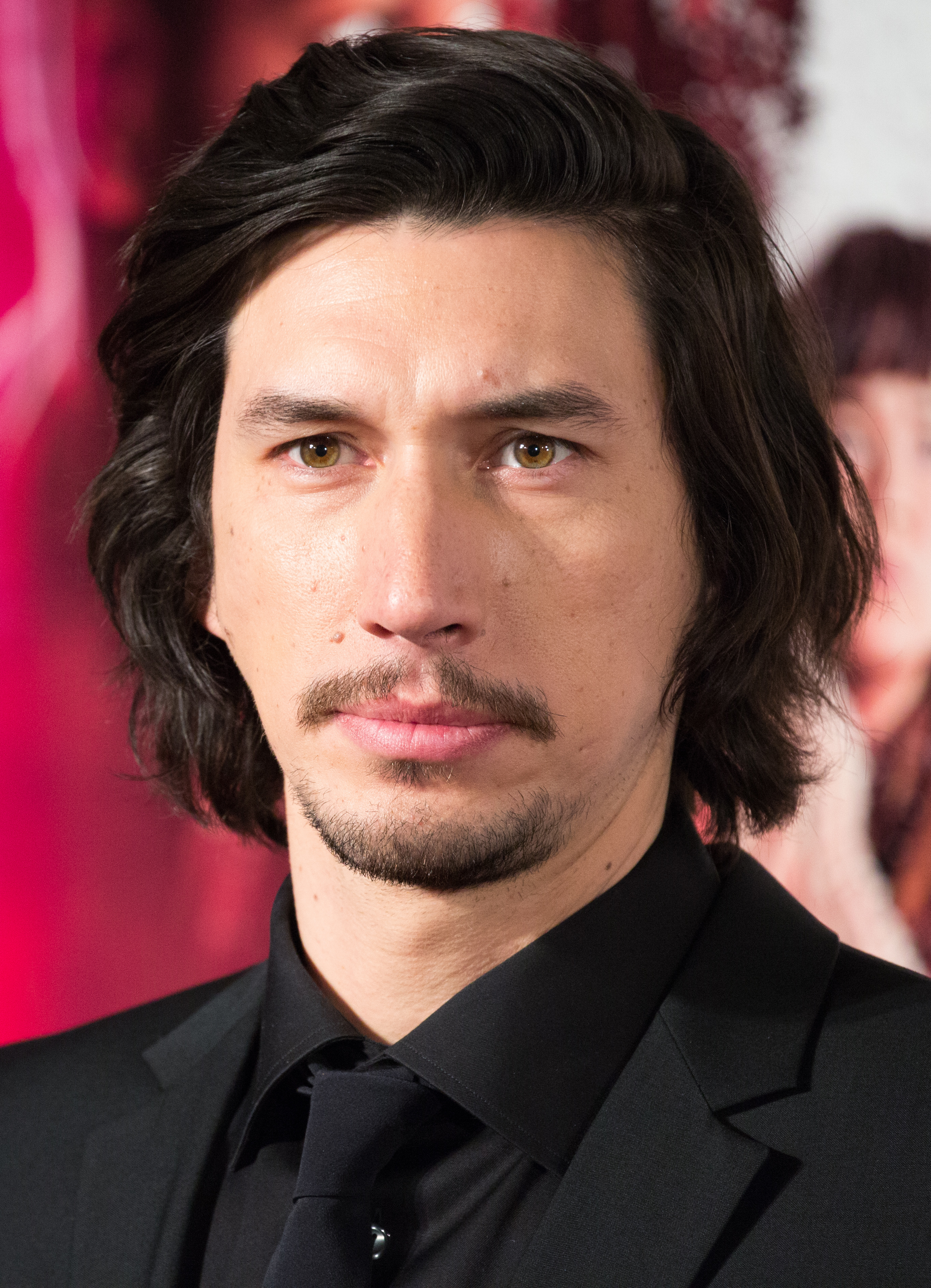
Adam Driver, Best Actor in a Leading Role winner

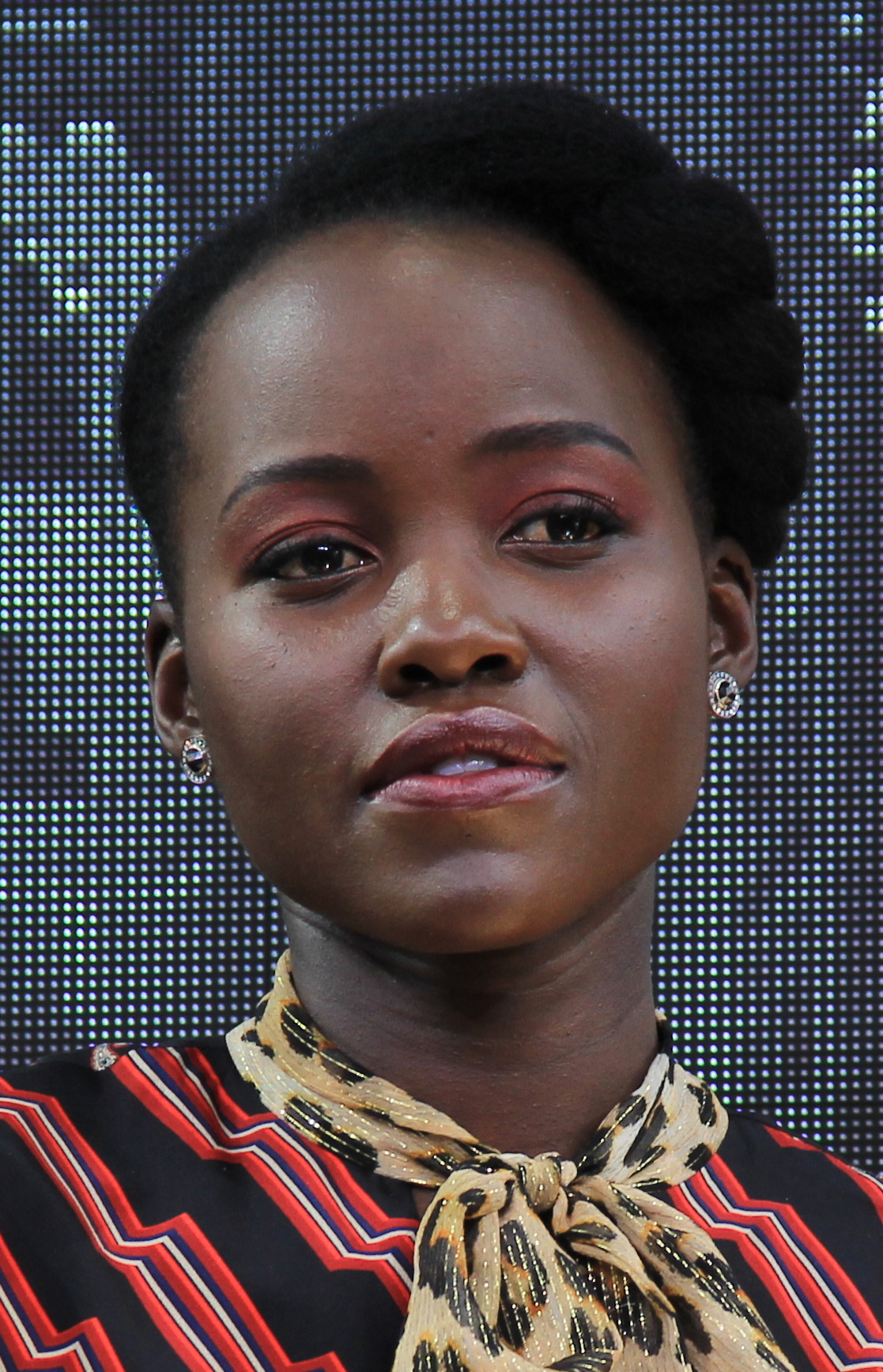
Lupita Nyong'o, Best Actress in a Leading Role winner

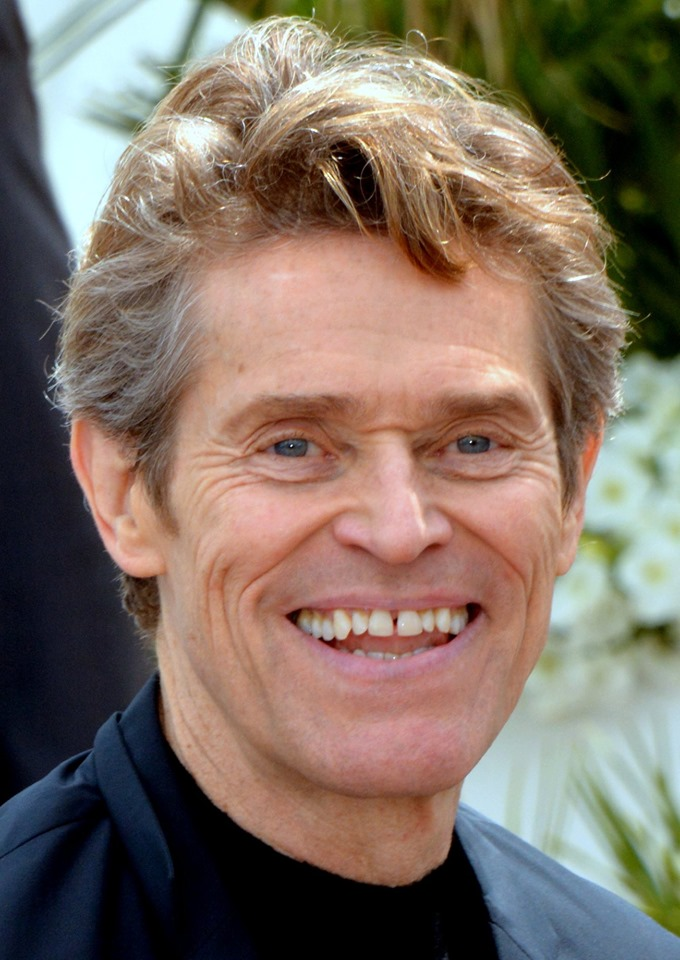
Willem Dafoe, Best Actor in a Supporting Role winner

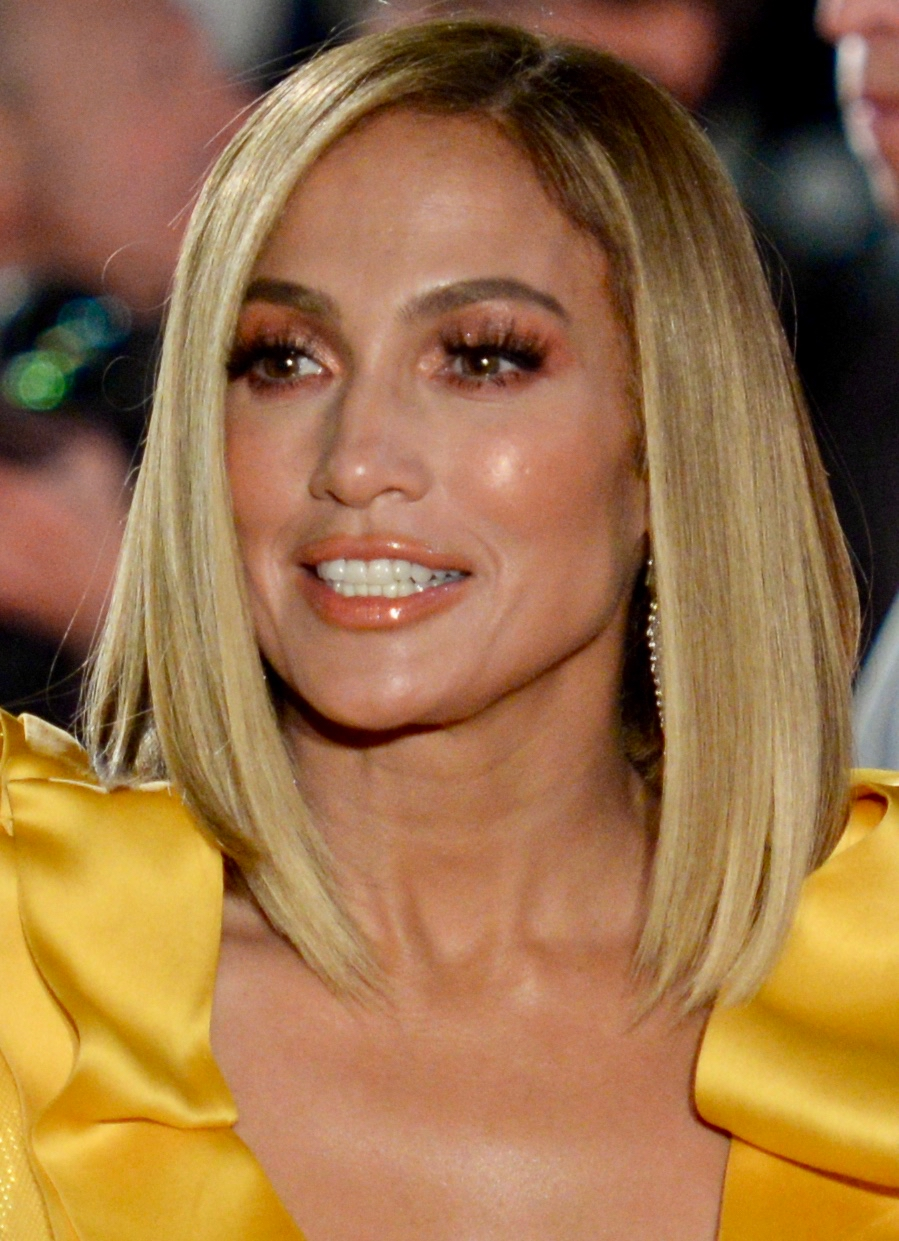
Jennifer Lopez, Best Actress in a Supporting Role winner

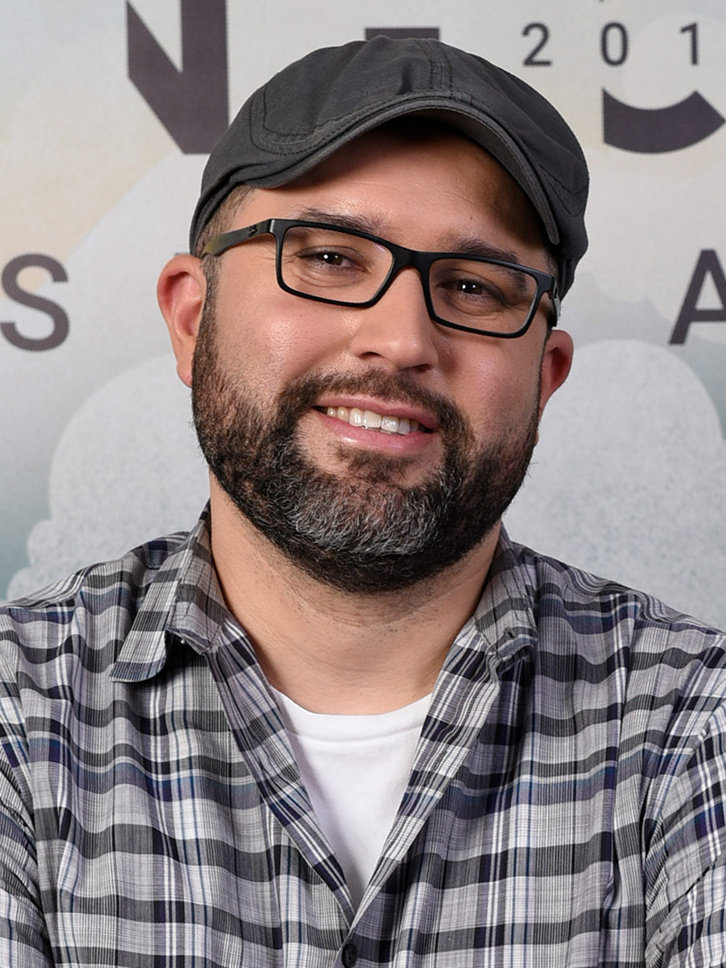
Josh Cooley, Best Animated Feature winner

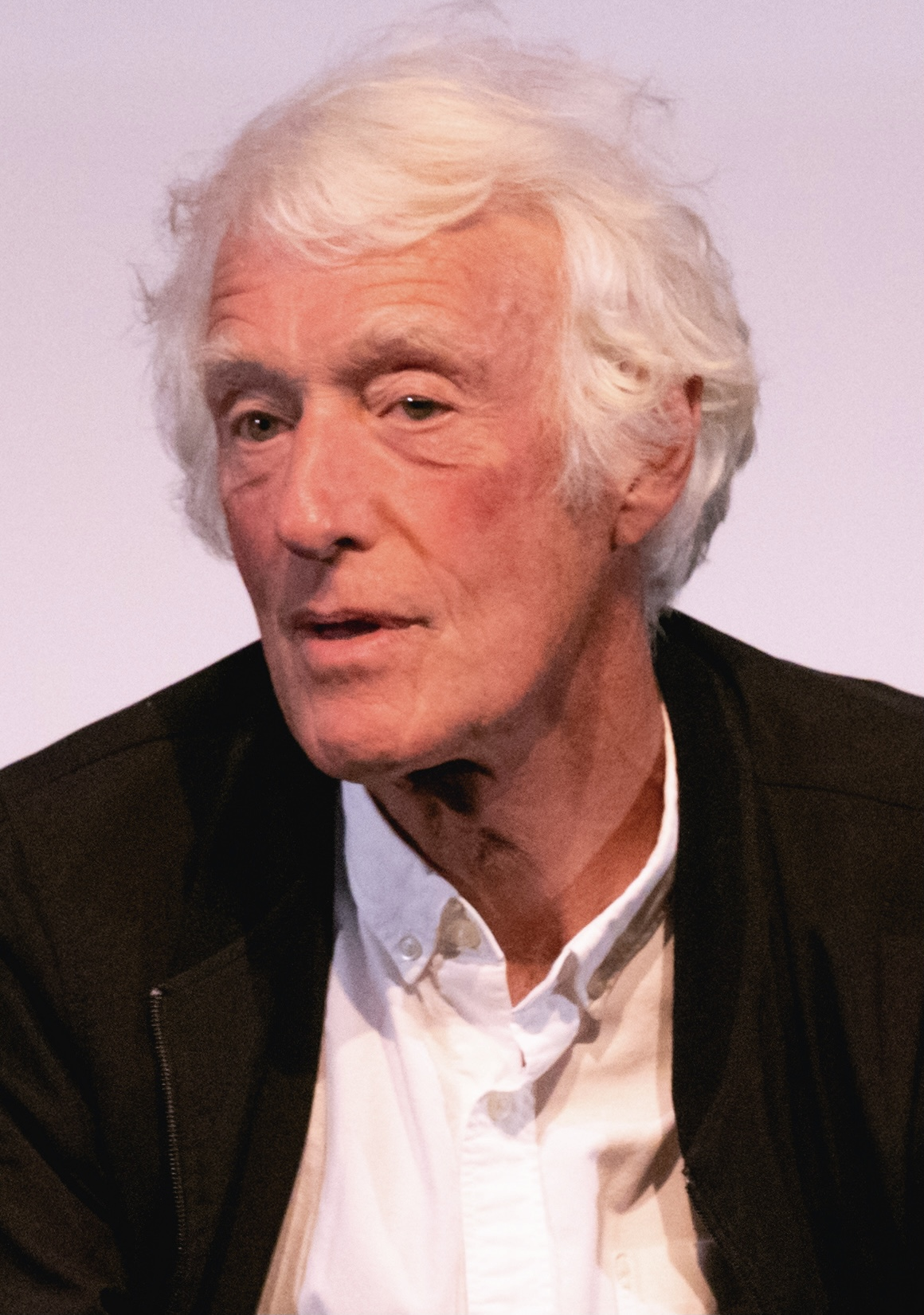
Roger Deakins, Best Cinematography winner

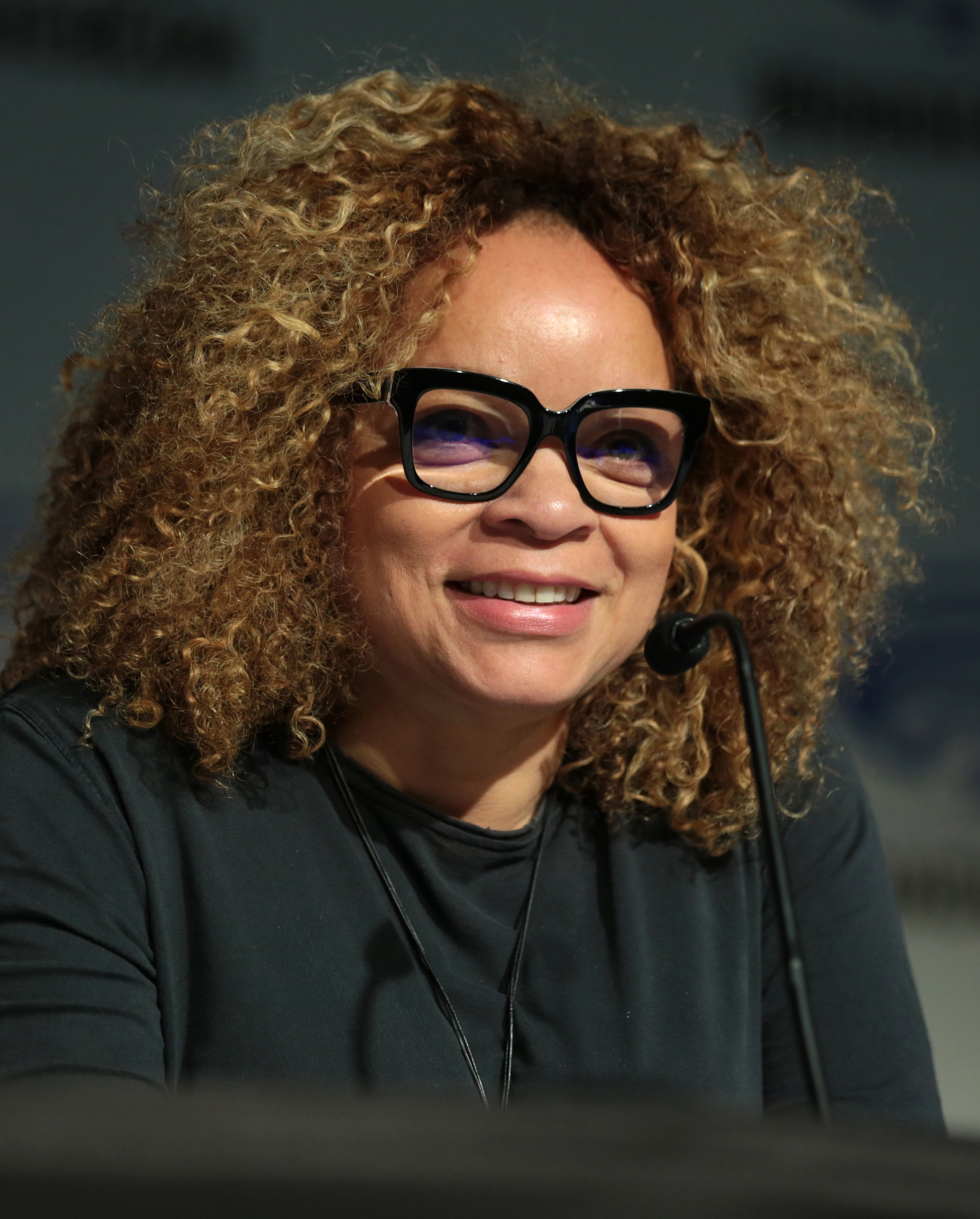
Ruth E. Carter, Best Costume Design winner

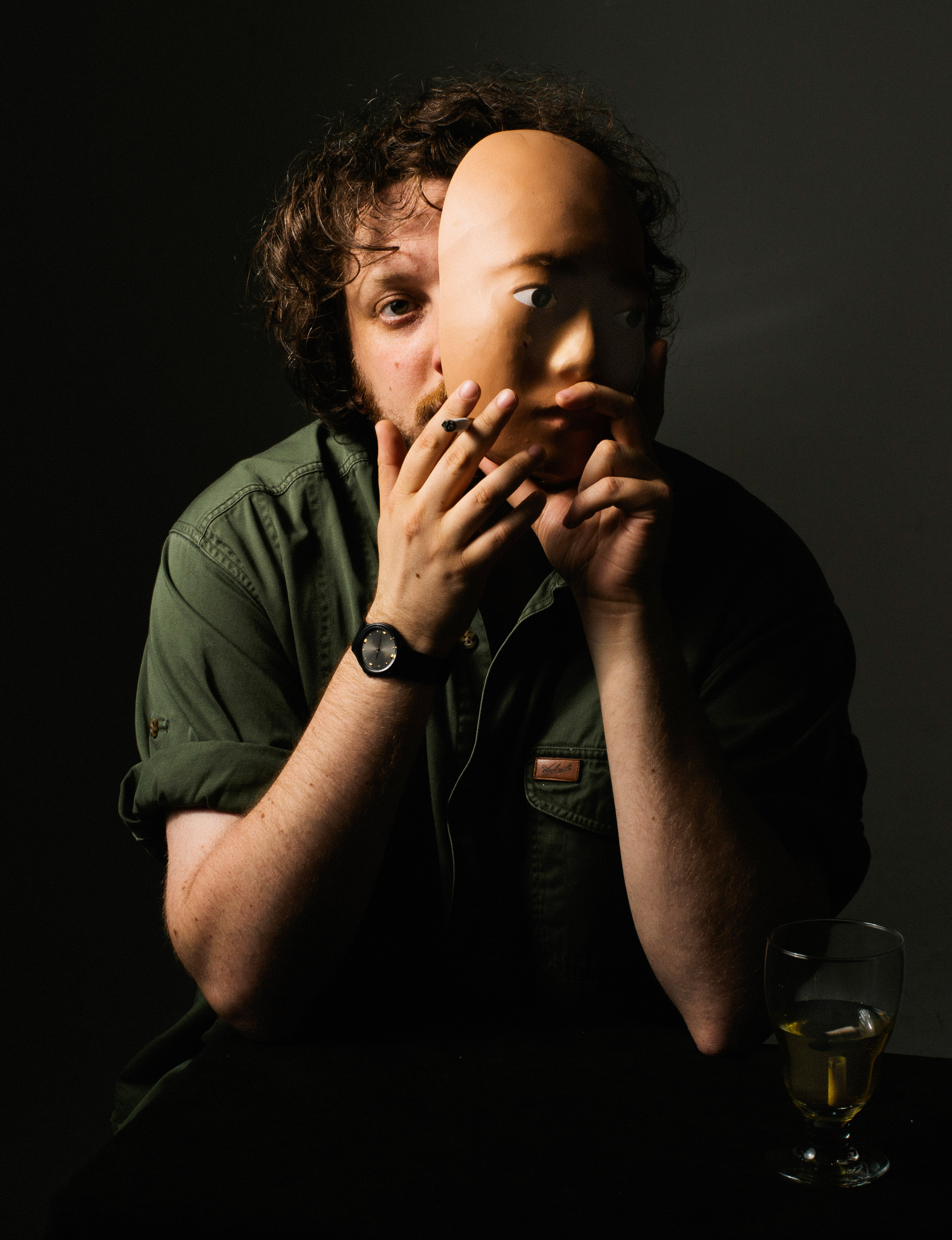
Oneohtrix Point Never, Best Original Score winner

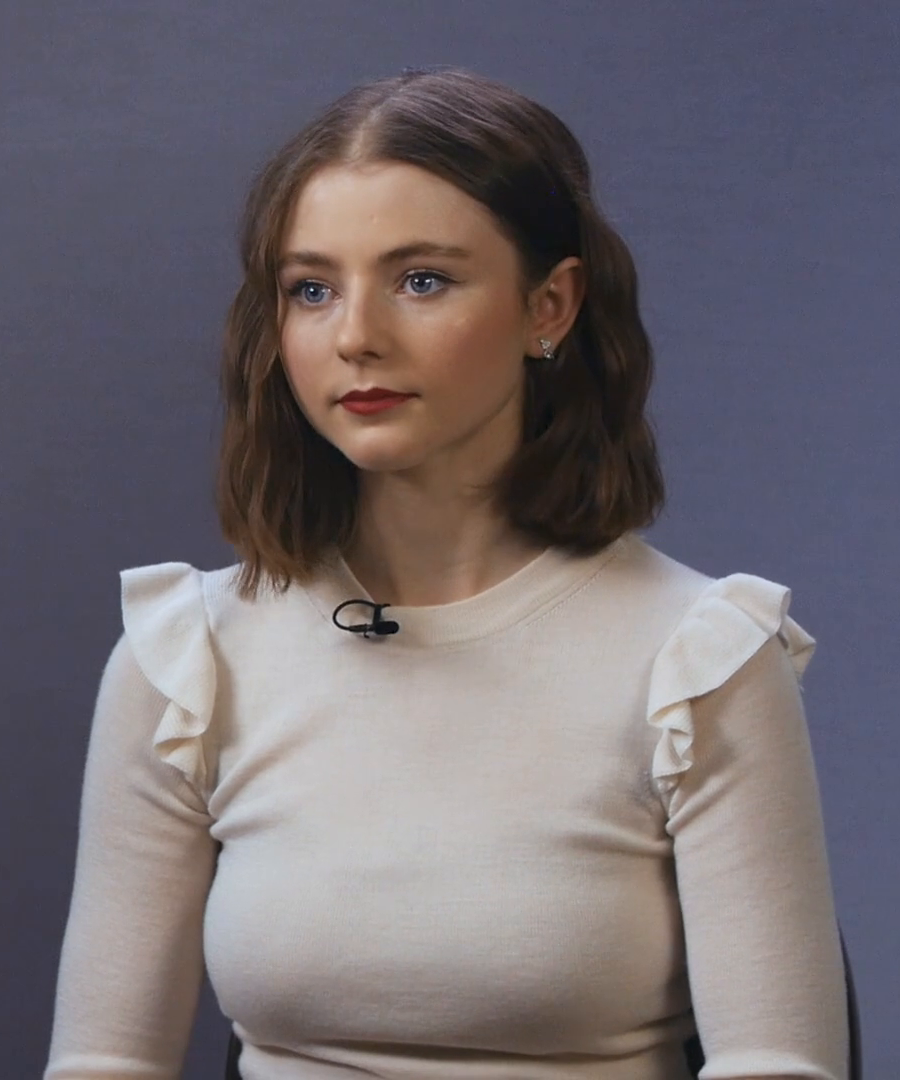
Thomasin McKenzie, Best Youth Performance winner

| Best Picture of the Year Parasite: 1917; The Farewell; Ford v Ferrari; The Irishman; The Lighthouse; Little Women; Marriage Story; Once Upon a Time in Hollywood; Uncut Gems | Best Director Bong Joon-ho – Parasite: Robert Eggers – The Lighthouse; Greta Gerwig – Little Women; Josh Safdie and Benny Safdie – Uncut Gems; Martin Scorsese – The Irishman |
| Best Actor in a Leading Role Adam Driver – Marriage Story as Charlie Barber: Antonio Banderas – Pain and Glory as Salvador Mallo; Robert De Niro – The Irishman as Frank Sheeran; Joaquin Phoenix – Joker as Arthur Fleck / Joker; Adam Sandler – Uncut Gems as Howard Ratner | Best Actress in a Leading Role Lupita Nyong'o – Us as Adelaide Wilson / Red: Awkwafina – The Farewell as Billi Wang; Scarlett Johansson – Marriage Story as Nicole Barber; Saoirse Ronan – Little Women as Josephine "Jo" March; Renée Zellweger – Judy as Judy Garland |
| Best Actor in a Supporting Role Willem Dafoe – The Lighthouse as Thomas Wake: Tom Hanks – A Beautiful Day in the Neighborhood as Fred Rogers; Song Kang-ho – Parasite as Kim Ki-taek; Joe Pesci – The Irishman as Russell Bufalino; Brad Pitt – Once Upon a Time in Hollywood as Cliff Booth | Best Actress in a Supporting Role Jennifer Lopez – Hustlers as Ramona Vega: Laura Dern – Marriage Story as Nora Fanshaw; Florence Pugh – Little Women as Amy March; Taylor Russell – Waves as Emily Williams; Zhao Shu-zhen – The Farewell as Nai Nai |
| Best Ensemble Cast Parasite: The Irishman; Knives Out; Little Women; Once Upon a Time in Hollywood | Best Action Choreography John Wick: Chapter 3 – Parabellum: 1917; Avengers: Endgame; Ford v Ferrari; Shadow |
| Best Screenplay Parasite – Bong Joon-ho and Han Jin-won: The Farewell – Lulu Wang; The Irishman – Steven Zaillian; Knives Out – Rian Johnson; Marriage Story – Noah Baumbach | Best Animated Feature Toy Story 4 – Josh Cooley: Frozen II – Chris Buck and Jennifer Lee; How to Train Your Dragon: The Hidden World – Dean DeBlois; I Lost My Body – Jérémy Clapin; Missing Link – Chris Butler |
| Best Documentary Feature Apollo 11 – Todd Douglas Miller: American Factory – Steven Bognar and Julia Reichert; For Sama – Waad Al-Kateab and Edward Watts; Fyre – Chris Smith; Honeyland – Ljubomir Stefanov and Tamara Kotevska | Best Foreign Language Film Parasite – Bong Joon-ho: The Farewell – Lulu Wang; Monos – Alejandro Landes; Pain and Glory – Pedro Almodóvar; Portrait of a Lady on Fire – Céline Sciamma |
| Best Cinematography 1917 – Roger Deakins: The Lighthouse – Jarin Blaschke; Once Upon a Time in Hollywood – Robert Richardson; Parasite – Hong Kyung-pyo; Portrait of a Lady on Fire – Claire Mathon | Best Costume Design Dolemite Is My Name – Ruth E. Carter: Downton Abbey – Anna Mary Scott Robbins; Little Women – Jacqueline Durran; Once Upon a Time in Hollywood – Arianne Phillips; Rocketman – Julian Day |
| Best Film Editing Uncut Gems – Ronald Bronstein and Benny Safdie: 1917 – Lee Smith; The Irishman – Thelma Schoonmaker; Once Upon a Time in Hollywood – Fred Raskin; Parasite – Yang Jin-mo | Best Original Score Uncut Gems – Oneohtrix Point Never: 1917 – Thomas Newman; Joker – Hildur Guðnadóttir; The Last Black Man in San Francisco – Emile Mosseri; Us – Michael Abels |
| Best Production Design Once Upon a Time in Hollywood – Barbara Ling (Production Design); Nancy Haigh (Set Decoration): 1917 – Dennis Gassner (Production Design); Lee Sandales (Set Decoration); The Irishman – Bob Shaw (Production Design); Regina Graves (Set Decoration); Little Women – Jess Gonchor (Production Design); Claire Kaufman (Set Decoration); Parasite – Lee Ha-jun | Best Visual Effects Ad Astra – Allen Maris, Jedediah Smith, Guillaume Rocheron, and Scott R. Fisher: 1917 – Guillaume Rocheron, Greg Butler, and Dominic Tuohy; Alita: Battle Angel – Nick Epstein, Joe Letteri, and Eric Saindon; Avengers: Endgame – Dan DeLeeuw, Matt Aitken, Russell Earl, and Dan Sudick; The Irishman – Pablo Helman, Leandro Estebecorena, Stephane Grabil, and Nelson Sepulveda |
| Best Youth Performance Thomasin McKenzie – Jojo Rabbit as Elsa Korr: Julia Butters – Once Upon a Time in Hollywood as Trudi Frazer; Kyliegh Curran – Doctor Sleep as Abra Stone; Roman Griffin Davis – Jojo Rabbit as Johannes "Jojo Rabbit" Betzler; Noah Jupe – Honey Boy as Otis Lort | Villain of the Year Red Dress – In Fabric: Russell Bufalino – The Irishman (portrayed by Joe Pesci); Arthur Fleck / Joker – Joker (portrayed by Joaquin Phoenix); Red – Us (portrayed by Lupita Nyong'o); Rose the Hat – Doctor Sleep (portrayed by Rebecca Ferguson) |

Films that received multiple nominations
| Nominations | Film |
|---|---|
| 10 | The Irishman |
| 9 | Parasite |
| 8 | Once Upon a Time in Hollywood |
| 7 | 1917 |
| 7 | Little Women |
| 5 | The Farewell |
| 5 | Marriage Story |
| 5 | Uncut Gems |
| 4 | The Lighthouse |
| 3 | Joker |
| 3 | Us |
| 2 | Avengers: Endgame |
| 2 | Doctor Sleep |
| 2 | Ford v Ferrari |
| 2 | Jojo Rabbit |
| 2 | Knives Out |
| 2 | Pain and Glory |
| 2 | Portrait of a Lady on Fire |

Films that received multiple awards
| Awards | Film |
|---|---|
| 5 | Parasite |
| 2 | Uncut Gems |
