= Ruth E. Carter =

American costume designer (born 1960)

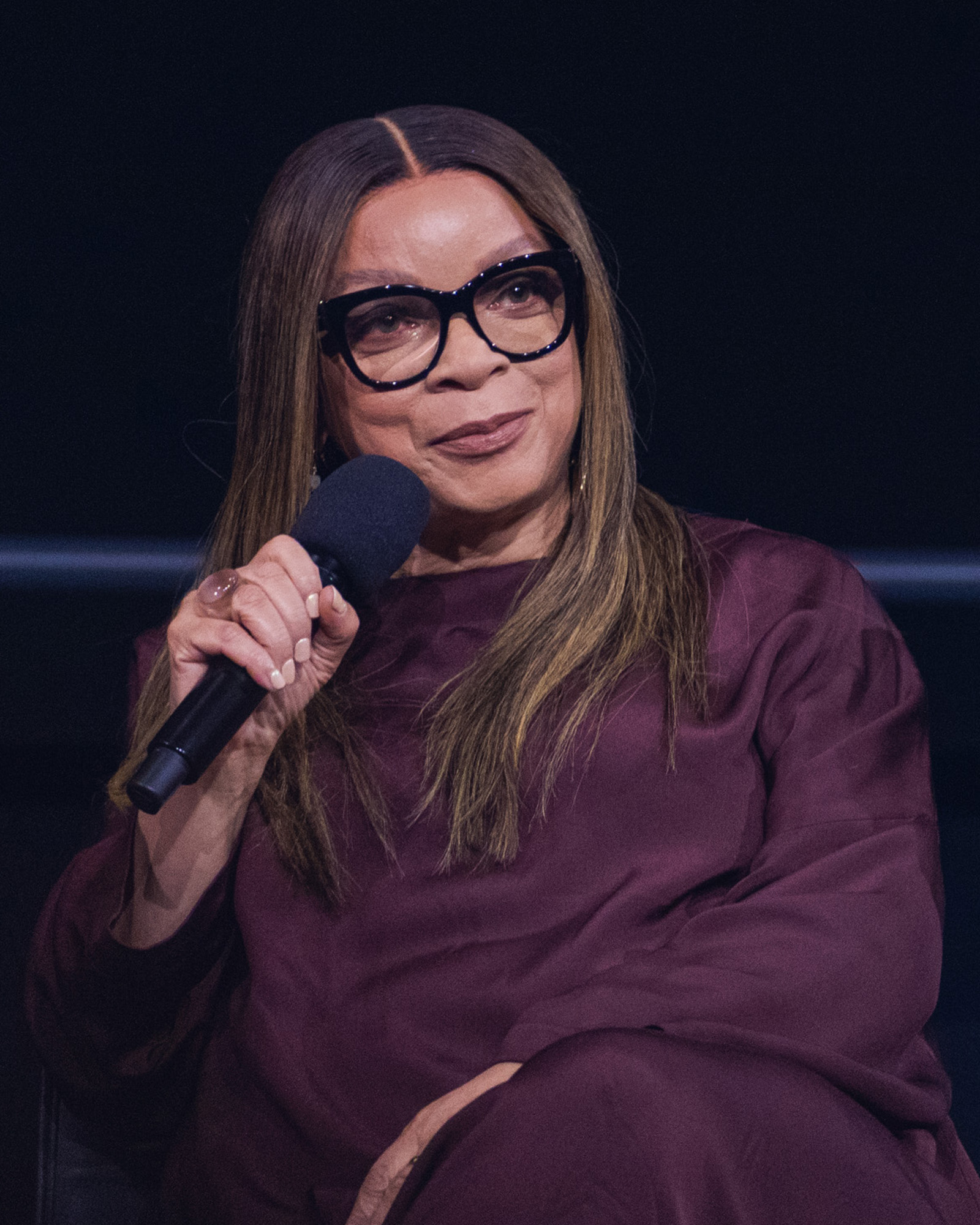
- Carter in 2025
- Born: April 10, 1960 (age 66); Springfield, Massachusetts, U.S.
- Education: Hampton University (BA)
- Occupation: Costume designer
- Years active: 1982–present

Ruth E. Carter (born April 10, 1960) is an American costume designer for film and television. She is best known for her collaborations with Spike Lee, John Singleton, and Ryan Coogler. During her film career, Carter has been nominated for the Academy Award for Best Costume Design, for her work on Lee's biographical film Malcolm X (1992), Steven Spielberg's historical drama film Amistad (1997), and won twice for Coogler's Marvel superhero films Black Panther (2018) and Black Panther: Wakanda Forever (2022); this made her the first African-American to win and be nominated for Best Costume Design. She was nominated for a fifth time for her work in Coogler's Sinners (2025), breaking the record for most-nominated Black woman in Oscar history.

Her other film credits include Do the Right Thing (1989), What's Love Got to Do with It (1993), Love & Basketball (2000), Serenity (2005), The Butler (2013), Selma (2014), Marshall (2017), Dolemite Is My Name (2019), Coming 2 America (2021). She also received a nomination for the Primetime Emmy Award for Outstanding Period Costumes for a Limited Series, for her work on the 2016 miniseries Roots. Carter is the recipient of the Career Achievement Award from the Costume Designers Guild Awards, in addition to receiving two competitive awards from the organization.

== Early life and education ==
Carter was born on April 10, 1960, in Springfield, Massachusetts, in a single-parent household. Her mother is Mabel Carter, and she was the youngest of eight children. At nine years old, she began attending the Boys & Girls Club. Using her mother's sewing machine, Carter learned from the organization how to read and design Simplicity patterns. She graduated in 1978 from Technical High School, Springfield, Massachusetts. In 1982, Carter graduated from Hampton Institute, later renamed Hampton University, with a Bachelor of Arts degree in Theatre Arts.

== Career ==
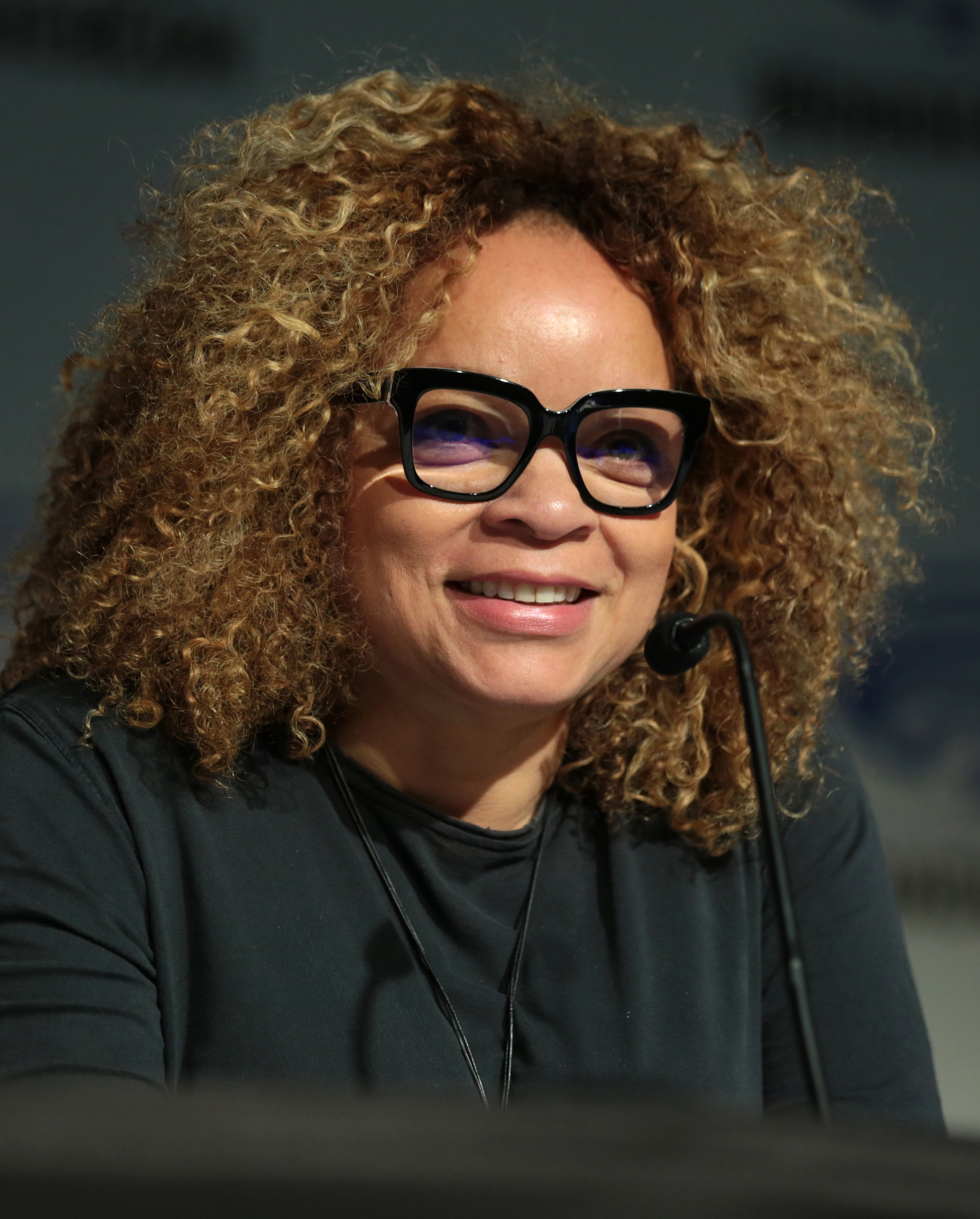
Carter in 2018

After graduating, Carter returned to her hometown, working as an intern for City Stage's costume department and then the Santa Fe Opera. In 1986, she moved to Los Angeles to work at the city's Theater Center. While working there, Carter met director Spike Lee, who hired her for his second film, School Daze (1988). She continued working on his subsequent films, including Do the Right Thing (1989), Mo' Better Blues (1990), Jungle Fever (1991), and Malcolm X (1992).

Aside from her work with Spike Lee, Carter also designed costumes for Steven Spielberg's Amistad (1997) and several of John Singleton's films, such as Rosewood (1997) and Baby Boy (2001). She further designed costumes for the American television drama series Being Mary Jane on BET Networks, created by Mara Brock Akil and starring Gabrielle Union.

Carter worked on the superhero film Black Panther (2018), directed by Ryan Coogler. Deriving from Afrofuturism, her costumes were inspired by many traditional African garments, including those of the Maasai and Ndebele people. She traveled to southern Africa to draw aesthetic inspirations and received permission to incorporate traditional Lesotho designs into the film's costumes.

Carter won two Oscars for Costume Design for Black Panther and Wakanda Forever, making history as the first African-American in that category. She also made history being the first African-American woman to win multiple Oscars in any category. A four-time Academy Award nominee, also for Malcolm X and Amistad, she has 50 feature film credits including The Butler, Selma, and Marshall; she also received the 2019 Costume Designers Guild Career Achievement Award.

In 2021, Carter received a star on the Hollywood Walk of Fame in the film category.

In 2023, Carter won her second Academy Award for Best Costume Design for Black Panther: Wakanda Forever (2022). During her acceptance speech, Carter dedicated her win to her mother, who had died during the prior week at the age of 101. Also in 2023, the North Carolina Museum of Art hosted an exhibit displaying more than sixty of Carter's original garments.

On January 22, 2026, Carter was nominated for the Academy Award for Best Costume Design for her work on Sinners; this was her fifth Academy Award nomination, making her the most nominated black woman in the history of the Academy Awards.

== Filmography ==
=== Film ===
Year	Title	Director
1988	School Daze	Spike Lee
1988	I'm Gonna Git You Sucka	Keenen Ivory Wayans
1989	Do the Right Thing	Spike Lee
1990	Mo' Better Blues	Spike Lee
1991	House Party 2	Doug McHenry; George Jackson
1991	Jungle Fever	Spike Lee
1991	The Five Heartbeats	Robert Townsend
1992	Malcolm X	Spike Lee
1993	The Meteor Man	Robert Townsend
1993	What's Love Got to Do with It	Brian Gibson
1994	Cobb	Ron Shelton
1994	Crooklyn	Spike Lee
1994	Surviving the Game	Ernest R. Dickerson
1995	Money Train	Joseph Ruben
1995	Clockers	Spike Lee
1996	The Great White Hype	Reginald Hudlin
1997	B*A*P*S	Robert Townsend
1997	Rosewood	John Singleton
1997	Amistad	Steven Spielberg
1999	Summer of Sam	Spike Lee
2000	Price of Glory	Carlos Ávila
2000	Love & Basketball	Gina Prince-Bythewood
2000	Shaft	John Singleton
2000	Bamboozled	Spike Lee
2001	Baby Boy	John Singleton
2001	Dr. Dolittle 2	Steve Carr
2002	I Spy	Betty Thomas
2003	Daddy Day Care	Steve Carr
2004	Against the Ropes	Charles S. Dutton
2005	Four Brothers	John Singleton
2005	Serenity	Joss Whedon
2008	Meet Dave	Brian Robbins
2009	Spread	David Mackenzie
2009	Black Dynamite	Scott Sanders
2009	Imagine That	Karey Kirkpatrick
2010	Frankie & Alice	Geoffrey Sax
2011	Abduction	John Singleton
2012	Sparkle	Salim Akil
2013	Teen Beach Movie	Jeffrey Hornaday
2013	Oldboy	Spike Lee
2013	The Butler	Lee Daniels
2014	The Best of Me	Michael Hoffman
2014	Selma	Ava DuVernay
2014	Da Sweet Blood of Jesus	Spike Lee
2015	Chi-Raq	Spike Lee
2016	Keeping Up with the Joneses	Greg Mottola
2017	Kidnap	Luis Prieto
2017	Marshall	Reginald Hudlin
2018	Black Panther	Ryan Coogler
2019	Above Suspicion	Phillip Noyce
2019	Dolemite Is My Name	Craig Brewer
2021	Coming 2 America	Craig Brewer
2022	Black Panther: Wakanda Forever	Ryan Coogler
2025	Sinners	Ryan Coogler
2025	The Pickup	Tim Story
2027	The Thomas Crown Affair	Michael B. Jordan

=== Television ===
Year	Title	Notes	Ref.
2014	Being Mary Jane	2 episodes	
2016	Roots	4 episodes	

== Awards and nominations ==
Major associations

Academy Awards

Year	Category	Nominated work	Result	Ref.
1993	Best Costume Design	Malcolm X	Nominated	
1998	Best Costume Design	Amistad	Nominated	
2019	Best Costume Design	Black Panther	Won	
2023	Best Costume Design	Black Panther: Wakanda Forever	Won	
2026	Best Costume Design	Sinners	Nominated	

BAFTA Awards

Year	Category	Nominated work	Result	Ref.
British Academy Film Awards
2026	Best Costume Design	Sinners	Nominated	

Emmy Awards

Year	Category	Nominated work	Result	Ref.
Primetime Emmy Awards
2016	Outstanding Costumes for a Period/Fantasy Series, Limited Series, or Movie	Roots (Episode: Night One")	Nominated	

Miscellaneous awards

List of Ruth E. Carter other awards and nominations
Award	Year (Note: Indicates the year of ceremony. Each year is linked to the article about the awards held that year, wherever possible.)	Category	Title	Result	Ref.
American Black Film Festival	2002	Career Achievement Award	—N/a	Honored	
Astra Film and Creative Arts Awards	2020	Best Costume Design	Dolemite Is My Name	Nominated	
Astra Film and Creative Arts Awards	2020	Artisan Achievement Award	—N/a	Honored	
Astra Film and Creative Arts Awards	2023	Best Costume Design	Black Panther: Wakanda Forever	Won	
Astra Film and Creative Arts Awards	2025	Best Costume Design	Sinners	Nominated	
Black Reel Awards	2019	Outstanding Costume Design	Black Panther	Won	
Black Reel Awards	2020	Outstanding Costume Design	Dolemite Is My Name	Won	
Black Reel Awards	2022	Outstanding Costume Design	Coming 2 America	Nominated	
Black Reel Awards	2023	Outstanding Costume Design	Black Panther: Wakanda Forever	Won	
Black Reel Awards	2026	Outstanding Costume Design	Sinners	Nominated	
Chicago Film Critics Association Awards	2019	Best Costume Design	Dolemite Is My Name	Nominated	
Chicago Film Critics Association Awards	2022	Best Costume Design	Black Panther: Wakanda Forever	Nominated	
Chicago Film Critics Association Awards	2025	Best Costume Design	Sinners	Nominated	
Costume Designers Guild Awards	2015	Excellence in Period Film	Selma	Nominated	
Costume Designers Guild Awards	2019	Excellence in Sci-Fi/Fantasy Film	Black Panther	Won	
Costume Designers Guild Awards	2019	Career Achievement Award	—N/a	Honored	
Costume Designers Guild Awards	2020	Excellence in Period Film	Dolemite Is My Name	Nominated	
Costume Designers Guild Awards	2022	Excellence in Contemporary Film	Coming 2 America	Won	
Costume Designers Guild Awards	2023	Excellence in Sci-Fi/Fantasy Film	Black Panther: Wakanda Forever	Nominated	
Costume Designers Guild Awards	2026	Excellence in Period Film	Sinners	Nominated	
Critics' Choice Awards	2019	Best Costume Design	Black Panther	Won	
Critics' Choice Awards	2020	Best Costume Design	Dolemite Is My Name	Won	
Critics' Choice Awards	2023	Best Costume Design	Black Panther: Wakanda Forever	Won	
Critics' Choice Awards	2026	Best Costume Design	Sinners	Nominated	
Fangoria Chainsaw Awards	2025	Best Costume Design	Sinners	Nominated	
FashFilmFete	2023	Costume Design Career Achievement Award in Film	—N/a	Honored	
Las Vegas Film Critics Society Awards	2019	Best Costume Design	Dolemite Is My Name	Won	
Las Vegas Film Critics Society Awards	2019	William Holden Lifetime Achievement Award	—N/a	Honored	
Las Vegas Film Critics Society Awards	2022	Best Costume Design	Black Panther: Wakanda Forever	Nominated	
Las Vegas Film Critics Society Awards	2025	Best Costume Design	Sinners	Nominated	
London Film Critics' Circle Awards	2023	Technical Achievement Award	Black Panther: Wakanda Forever	Nominated	
NAACP Image Awards	2022	Vanguard Award	—N/a	Honored	
NAACP Image Awards	2023	Outstanding Costume Design	Black Panther: Wakanda Forever	Won	
NAACP Image Awards	2026	Outstanding Costume Design	Sinners	Won	
Online Film Critics Society Awards	2019	Best Costume Design	Black Panther	Won	
Online Film Critics Society Awards	2023	Best Costume Design	Black Panther: Wakanda Forever	Won	
Online Film Critics Society Awards	2023	Lifetime Achievement Award	—N/a	Honored	
Online Film Critics Society Awards	2026	Best Costume Design	Sinners	Won	
Phoenix Film Critics Society Awards	2022	Best Costume Design	Black Panther: Wakanda Forever	Won	
Phoenix Film Critics Society Awards	2025	Best Costume Design	Sinners	Won	
San Diego Film Critics Society Awards	2019	Best Costume Design	Dolemite Is My Name	Won	
San Diego Film Critics Society Awards	2023	Best Costume Design	Black Panther: Wakanda Forever	Nominated	
San Diego Film Critics Society Awards	2025	Best Costume Design	Sinners	Runner-up (Note: Tied with Kate Hawley for Frankenstein)	
Satellite Awards	1998	Best Costume Design	Amistad	Nominated	
Satellite Awards	2019	Best Costume Design	Black Panther	Nominated	
Satellite Awards	2019	Best Costume Design	Dolemite Is My Name	Won	
Satellite Awards	2022	Best Costume Design	Coming 2 America	Nominated	
Satellite Awards	2024	Best Costume Design	Black Panther: Wakanda Forever	Nominated	
Satellite Awards	2026	Best Costume Design	Sinners	Nominated	
Saturn Awards	2018	Best Costume Design	Black Panther	Nominated	
Saturn Awards	2024	Best Costume Design	Black Panther: Wakanda Forever	Nominated	
Saturn Awards	2026	Best Costume Design	Sinners	Nominated	
Seattle Film Critics Society Awards	2018	Best Costume Design	Black Panther	Won	
Seattle Film Critics Society Awards	2019	Best Costume Design	Dolemite Is My Name	Won	
Seattle Film Critics Society Awards	2023	Best Costume Design	Black Panther: Wakanda Forever	Nominated	
Seattle Film Critics Society Awards	2025	Best Costume Design	Sinners	Nominated	
St. Louis Film Critics Association Awards	2022	Best Costume Design	Black Panther: Wakanda Forever	Runner-up	
St. Louis Film Critics Association Awards	2025	Best Costume Design	Sinners	Runner-up	

- 2015: Visionary Award at the Essence Black Women in Hollywood Luncheon
- 2019: Suffolk University, Honorary Degree - Doctor of Humane Letters

== Bibliography ==
- The Art of Ruth E. Carter. Chronicle Books. 2023. ISBN 978-1797203065.

== See also ==
- List of black Academy Award winners and nominees
