= Benjamin Karim =

American activist and minister (1932–2005)

- Karim (right) with Malcolm X
- Born: Benjamin Goodman; July 24, 1932; Suffolk, Virginia, US
- Died: August 2, 2005 (aged 73); Richmond, Virginia, US
- Other name: Benjamin 2X
- Occupations: Activist, minister, author
- Known for: Associate of Malcolm X

Benjamin Karim (born Benjamin Goodman; July 14, 1932 – August 2, 2005), also known as Benjamin 2X, was an American activist, minister, and author. He was a close associate of Malcolm X.

== Biography ==
Karim was born Benjamin Goodman, on July 14, 1932, in Suffolk, Virginia, the son of Wilbur Bryant Goodman and Mary Goodman. He served in the United States Air Force during the Korean War. After the war, he moved to New York City, where he worked as an audio engineer.

Karim first heard Malcolm X speak in 1957. After hearing Malcolm speak, he became a close associate of his. He converted to the Nation of Islam (NOI) and served as an event speaker for the organization, as well as directing an education program at Masjid Malcolm Shabazz. He also changed his name to Benjamin 2X.

Karim began educating himself on black history, with him having later admitted to not knowing that black history existed before hearing Malcolm X speak. As an associate to Malcolm X, he often represented him at speaking events. He sided with Malcolm after he left the NOI and founded the Organization of Afro-American Unity. He introduced Malcolm for a speaking event at the Audubon Ballroom, on February 21, 1965, during which Malcolm was assassinated.

After Malcolm's assassination, Karim rejoined the NOI and changed his name from Benjamin 2X to Benjamin Karim. He spent the following decades educating on Malcolm's life and beliefs, especially his beliefs of self-sufficiency and education among African Americans. He was an advisor in the production of Spike Lee's 1992 film Malcolm X; and was portrayed in the film by Jean-Claude La Marre. He also wrote the book Remembering Malcolm, a biography, alongside Peter Skutches and Paul Gallen.

Karim had three sons and two daughters, and was married to Linda Karim. He died on August 2, 2005, aged 73, in Richmond, Virginia, from injuries sustained in a fall.

== See also ==
- Bibliography of Malcolm X
- Bibliography of Martin Luther King Jr.
