= Malcolm X (1992 film) =

1992 American biographical film directed by Spike Lee

- International theatrical release poster
- Directed by: Spike Lee
- Screenplay by: Arnold Perl; Spike Lee
- Based on: The Autobiography of Malcolm X by Malcolm X with Alex Haley
- Produced by: Marvin Worth; Spike Lee
- Starring: Denzel Washington; Angela Bassett; Albert Hall; Al Freeman Jr.; Delroy Lindo; Spike Lee
- Cinematography: Ernest Dickerson
- Edited by: Barry Alexander Brown
- Music by: Terence Blanchard
- Production company: 40 Acres and a Mule Filmworks
- Distributed by: Warner Bros. (United States); Largo International (International)
- Release date: November 18, 1992
- Running time: 202 minutes
- Country: United States
- Language: English
- Budget: $35 million
- Box office: $73 million

Malcolm X is a 1992 American epic biographical drama film about the civil rights activist Malcolm X. Directed and co-written by Spike Lee, the film stars Denzel Washington in the title role, alongside Angela Bassett, Albert Hall, Al Freeman Jr., and Delroy Lindo. Lee has a supporting role, while Black Panther Party co-founder Bobby Seale, the Rev. Al Sharpton, and future South African president Nelson Mandela make cameo appearances.

The screenplay, co-credited to Lee and Arnold Perl, is based largely on Alex Haley's 1965 book The Autobiography of Malcolm X. Haley had collaborated with Malcolm X on the book beginning in 1963 and completed it after Malcolm X's death. The film follows key events in Malcolm X's life: his criminal career, his incarceration, his conversion to Islam, his ministry as a member of the Nation of Islam and his later falling out with the organization, his marriage to Betty X, his pilgrimage to Mecca and reevaluation of his views concerning whites, and his assassination in 1965. Defining childhood incidents, including his father's death, his mother's mental illness, and his experiences with racism are shown in flashbacks.

Malcolm X was distributed by Warner Bros. in the United States and by Largo International in other territories and was released in the United States on November 18, 1992. The same year, Denzel Washington won the New York Film Critics Circle Award for Best Actor for his performance. At the 65th Academy Awards, the film was nominated for Best Actor (Washington) and Best Costume Design (Ruth E. Carter). In 2010, the film was selected for preservation in the United States National Film Registry by the Library of Congress as being "culturally, historically, or aesthetically significant".

== Plot ==
One night shortly before Malcolm Little is born, a party of Klansmen surround the Little family home in Omaha, Nebraska, break all the windows, and ride off into the night.

Malcolm has a Grenadian mother and African-American father. His father, an activist for Black rights, is killed. His death is registered as a suicide and the family receives no compensation. Malcolm and his siblings are put into protective care. He performs well in school and dreams of being a lawyer, but his teacher discourages it due to his skin color.

During World War II, Malcolm lives in Boston. One night at a dance, he catches the attention of the white Sophia, and the two begin a sexual relationship. Malcolm travels to New York City's Harlem with Sophia, where he meets "West Indian" Archie, a gangster who runs a local numbers game, at a bar. The two become friends and start co-operating an illegal numbers racket. One night at a club, Malcolm claims to have bet on a winning number; Archie disputes this, denying him a large sum of money. A conflict ensues between the two and Malcolm returns to Boston after an attempt on his life. Malcolm, Sophia, his friend Shorty, and a woman named Peg decide to perform burglaries to earn money.

By 1946, the group has accrued a large amount of money from their crimes. However, they are later arrested. The two women are sentenced to two years as first offenders, while Malcolm and Shorty are sentenced to 8–10 years. While incarcerated, Malcolm meets Baines, a member of the Nation of Islam, who directs him to the teachings of the group's leader Elijah Muhammad. Malcolm grows interested in the Muslim religion and lifestyle promoted by the group, and begins to resent white people for mistreating his race. He is paroled from prison in 1952 after serving six years, and travels to the Nation of Islam's headquarters in Chicago. There, he meets Muhammad, who instructs him to replace his surname "Little" with "X", which symbolizes his lost African surname that was taken from his ancestors by white slavemasters; he is rechristened as "Malcolm X".

Malcolm returns to Harlem and begins to preach the Nation's message; over time, his speeches draw large crowds of onlookers. He proposes ideas such as African-American separation from white Americans. In 1958, Malcolm meets nurse Betty Sanders. The two begin dating, quickly marry and become the parents of four daughters. Several years later, he is now in a high position as the spokesperson of the Nation of Islam. During this time, he learns that Muhammad had fathered numerous children out of wedlock, contradicting his teachings and Islam.

After President John F. Kennedy is assassinated, Malcolm comments that the assassination was the product of white violence that has been prevalent in America since its founding, saying the killing is an example of "the devil's chickens coming home to roost." This statement damages his reputation and Muhammad suspends him from speaking to the press or at temples for 90 days. He announces that he has been forced out of the Nation of Islam and will start his own mosque in New York.

In early 1964, Malcolm goes on a pilgrimage to Mecca where he meets Muslims from all races, including white. His house is firebombed in early 1965.

On February 21, 1965, Malcolm speaks before a crowd at the Audubon Ballroom, but assassins shoot him several times. One of his bodyguards shoots one of the shooters in the leg before a furious crowd beats him. Malcolm is transported to a hospital, where his death is announced to the crowd.

The film concludes with a series of clips showing the aftermath of Malcolm's death. Martin Luther King Jr. delivers a eulogy to him, and Ossie Davis recites a speech at his funeral. Nelson Mandela delivers a speech to a school, quoting an excerpt from one of Malcolm's speeches.

== Cast ==
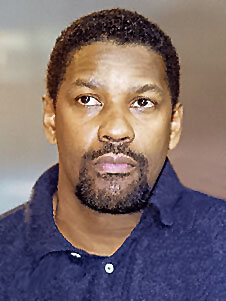
Denzel Washington (pictured in 2000) portrays Malcolm X.

- Denzel Washington as Malcolm X, a former petty criminal and convict, Nation of Islam (NOI) minister and activist for African Americans
- Angela Bassett as Betty Shabazz, a nurse and NOI activist who marries Malcolm
- Albert Hall as Baines, the convict who mentors Malcolm and converts him to Islam
- Al Freeman Jr. as Elijah Muhammad, the leader of the Nation of Islam
- Delroy Lindo as West Indian Archie, a Harlem gangster who runs a local numbers game and takes a young Malcolm under his wing
- Spike Lee as Shorty, Malcolm's childhood friend
- Theresa Randle as Laura, a young Malcolm's romantic interest
- Kate Vernon as Sophia, Malcolm's lover as a younger criminal
- Ernest Lee Thomas as Sidney, a member of the Fruit of Islam and Baines son who is assigned to protect Malcolm
- Christopher Plummer as Chaplain Gill, prison chaplain
- Lonette McKee as Louise Little, Malcolm's mother
- Tommy Hollis as Earl Little, Malcolm's father, a reverend and vocal activist who is murdered
- Giancarlo Esposito as Talmadge X Hayer, an NOI member who is part of the five-man group that assassinates Malcolm
- Wendell Pierce as Ben Thomas, a member of the assassination team who supervises the plot
- Leonard L. Thomas as Leon Davis, a member of the assassination team who assists Hayer in shooting Malcolm with handguns
- Leland Gantt as Wilber McKinley, a member of the assassination team who creates a distraction to lure Malcolm's guards away
- Roger Guenveur Smith as Rudy, a caterer-turned-criminal who assists Malcolm in his robberies
- James McDaniel as Brother Earl
- Steve White as Brother Johnson
- Veronica Webb as Sister Lucille Rosary
- Phyllis Yvonne Stickney as Honey
- Jean-Claude La Marre as Benjamin 2X, Malcolm's aide
- Debi Mazar as Peg, Sophia's friend and partner-in-crime
- Karen Allen as Miss Dunne, the social worker who forcibly separates Malcolm from his mother and siblings
- Peter Boyle as NYPD Captain Green
- David Patrick Kelly as Mr. Ostrowski, Malcolm's elementary school teacher

Political activists Bobby Seale and Al Sharpton make cameo appearances as a pair of street preachers. Civil rights attorney William Kunstler appears as the judge who sentences Malcolm and Shorty to prison. Future South African President Nelson Mandela appears as a Soweto school teacher delivering a lecture on X. Spike Lee regular Nicholas Turturro has a minor role as a Boston police officer. Michael Imperioli briefly appears as a news reporter. Film director John Sayles appears as an FBI agent surveilling Malcolm. Washington's then-eight-year-old son John David Washington appears as a Harlem elementary school student; John David would later go on to star as the lead of Lee's 2018 film BlacKkKlansman.

Ossie Davis provides voiceover narration over the film's closing sequence, reading the eulogy he had originally performed at the real Malcolm's funeral.

== Production ==
It's such a great story, a great American story, and it reflects our society in so many ways. Here's a guy who essentially led so many lives. He pulled himself out of the gutter. He went from country boy to hipster and semi-hoodlum. From there he went to prison, where he became a Muslim. Then he was a spiritual leader who evolved into a humanitarian.

— Producer Marvin Worth on his 25-year effort to make a film about the life of Malcolm X.

Producer Marvin Worth acquired the rights to The Autobiography of Malcolm X in 1967. Worth had met Malcolm X, then called "Detroit Red," as a teenager selling drugs in New York City. Worth was fifteen at the time, and spending time around jazz clubs in the area. As Worth remembers: "He was selling grass. He was sixteen or seventeen but looked older. He was very witty, a funny guy, and he had this extraordinary charisma. A great dancer and a great dresser. He was very good-looking, very, very tall. Girls always noticed him. He was quite a special guy."

Early on, the production had difficulties telling the entire story, in part due to unresolved questions surrounding Malcolm X's assassination. In 1971, Worth made a well-received documentary Malcolm X (1972), which received an Academy Award nomination in that category. The project remained unrealized. However, several major entertainers were attached to it at various times, including Richard Pryor, Eddie Murphy, and director Sidney Lumet.

=== Screenplay ===
In 1968, Worth commissioned a screenplay from novelist James Baldwin, who was later joined by Arnold Perl, a screenwriter who had been a victim of McCarthy-era blacklisting. However, the screenplay took longer to develop than anticipated. Perl died in 1971.

Baldwin developed his work on the screenplay into the 1972 book One Day, When I Was Lost: A Scenario Based on Alex Haley's The Autobiography of Malcolm X. In 1976, Baldwin wrote of his experience, "I think that I would rather be horsewhipped, or incarcerated in the forthright bedlam of Bellevue, than repeat the adventure". Baldwin died in 1987. Several authors attempted drafts, including David Mamet, David Bradley, Charles Fuller and Calder Willingham. Once Spike Lee took over as director, he rewrote the Baldwin-Perl script. Due to the revisions, the Baldwin family asked the producer to take his name off the credits. Thus Malcolm X only credits Perl and Lee as the writers and Malcolm X and Alex Haley as the authors of The Autobiography of Malcolm X.

=== Production difficulties ===
The production was considered controversial long before filming began. The crux of the controversy was Malcolm X's denunciation of whites before he undertook his hajj. He was, arguably, not well regarded among white citizens by and large; however, he had risen to become a hero in the African-American community and a symbol of blacks' struggles, particularly during the presidencies of Ronald Reagan and George H. W. Bush. In the three years before the movie's release, sales of The Autobiography of Malcolm X had increased 300 percent, and four of his books had a nine-fold increase in sales between 1986 and 1991.

Once Warner Bros. agreed to the project, they initially wanted Oscar-nominated Canadian film director Norman Jewison to direct the film. Jewison, director of the seminal civil rights film In the Heat of the Night (1967), was able to bring Denzel Washington into the project to play Malcolm X. Jewison and Washington previously worked together in A Soldier's Story (1984). Jewison also offered Eddie Murphy the role of Alex Haley in this version of the film. A protest erupted over the fact that a white director was slated to make the film. Spike Lee was one of the main voices of criticism; since college, he had considered a film adaptation of The Autobiography of Malcolm X to be a dream project. Lee and others felt that it was appropriate that only a black person should direct Malcolm X. Lee later denied saying this.

After the public outcry against Jewison, Worth concluded that "it needed a black director at this point. It was insurmountable the other way ... There's a grave responsibility here."

Spike Lee was soon named the director, and he substantially edited the script. "I'm directing this movie and I rewrote the script, and I'm an artist and there's just no two ways around it: this film about Malcolm X is going to be my vision of Malcolm X. But it's not like I'm sitting atop a mountain saying, 'Screw everyone, this is the Malcolm I see.' I've done the research, I've talked to the people who were there." Soon after Spike Lee was announced as the director and before its release, Malcolm X received criticism by black nationalists and members of the United Front to Preserve the Legacy of Malcolm X, headed by poet and playwright Amiri Baraka, who were worried about Lee's portrayal of Malcolm X. One protest in Harlem drew over 200 people. Some based their opinion on dislike of Lee's previous films; others were concerned that he would focus on Malcolm X's life before he converted to Islam. Baraka bluntly accused Spike Lee of being a "Buppie", stating "We will not let Malcolm X's life be trashed to make middle-class Negroes sleep easier", compelling others to write the director and warn him "not to mess up Malcolm's life." Some, including Lee himself, noted the irony that many of the arguments made against him mirrored those made against Jewison.

Although Washington agreed to play Malcolm X while Jewison was scheduled to direct the film, Lee stated he never envisioned any actor other than Washington in the role. The two had previously worked together on Mo' Better Blues (1990), and Lee noted that Washington had "really captured Malcolm" in his Off Broadway performance as him.

=== Budget issues ===
Spike Lee also encountered difficulty in securing a sufficient budget. Lee told Warner Bros. and the bond company that a budget of over US$30 million was necessary; the studio disagreed and offered a lower amount. Following advice from fellow director Francis Ford Coppola, Lee got "the movie company pregnant": taking the movie far enough along into actual production to attempt to force the studio to increase the budget. The film, initially budgeted at $28 million, climbed to nearly $33 million. Lee contributed $2 million of his own $3 million salary. Completion Bond Company, which assumed financial control in January 1992, refused to approve any more expenditures; in addition, the studio and bond company instructed Lee that the film could be no longer than two hours, fifteen minutes in length. The resulting conflict caused the project to be shut down in post-production.

The film was saved by the financial intervention of prominent black Americans, some of whom appear in the film: Bill Cosby, Oprah Winfrey, Michael Jordan, Magic Johnson, Janet Jackson, Prince, Tracy Chapman, and Peggy Cooper Cafritz, founder of the Duke Ellington School of the Arts. Their contributions were made as donations; as Lee noted: "This is not a loan. They are not investing in the film. These are black folks with some money who came to the rescue of the movie. As a result, this film will be my version. Not the bond company's version, not Warner Brothers'. I will do the film the way it ought to be, and it will be over three hours." The actions of such prominent members of the African American community giving their money helped finish the project as Lee envisioned it.

The dissatisfaction Warner Bros. had for how Lee funded the film by completing it through the help of his African American friends later resulted in Warner Bros. blocking out Lee from participating in the development of Space Jam (1996), as Lee had approached Joe Pytka about polishing the film's script.

=== Request for black interviewers ===
I'm doing what every other person in Hollywood does: they dictate who they want to do interviews with. Tom Cruise, Robert Redford, whoever. People throw their weight around. Well, I get many requests now for interviews, and I would like African-Americans to interview me. [...] Spike Lee has never said he only wants black journalists to interview him. What I'm doing is using whatever clout I have to get qualified African-Americans assignments. The real crime is white publications don't have black writers, that's the crime.

— Spike Lee explaining his request for black interviewers

One month before the film was released, Lee asked that media outlets send black journalists to interview him. The request proved controversial. Though it was common practice for celebrities to pick interviewers who were known to be sympathetic to them, it was the first time in many years in which race had been used as a qualification. Lee clarified that he was not barring white interviewers from interviewing him, but that he said, given the subject matter of the film, that black writers have "more insight about Malcolm than white writers".

The request was turned down by the Los Angeles Times, but several others agreed including Premiere magazine, Vogue, Interview and Rolling Stone. The Los Angeles Times explained they did not give writer approval. The editor of Premiere noted that the request created internal discussions that resulted in changes at the magazine: "Had we had a history of putting a lot of black writers on stories about the movie industry we'd be in a stronger position. But we didn't. It was an interesting challenge he laid down. It caused some personnel changes. We've hired a black writer and a black editor".

=== Filming ===
Malcolm X's widow, Dr. Betty Shabazz, served as a consultant to the film. The Fruit of Islam, the defense arm of the Nation of Islam, provided security for the movie.

When Denzel Washington took the role of Malcolm X in the play, When the Chickens Come Home to Roost, which dealt with the relationship between Malcolm X and Elijah Muhammad, he admitted he knew little about Malcolm X and had not yet read The Autobiography of Malcolm X. Washington prepared by reading books and articles by and about Malcolm X and went over hours of tape and film footage of speeches. The play opened in 1981 and earned Washington a warm review by Frank Rich, who was at the time the chief theater critic of The New York Times. Upon being cast in the film, he interviewed people who knew Malcolm X, among them Betty Shabazz and two of his brothers. Although they had different upbringings, Washington tried to focus on what he had in common with his character: during the making of the movie Washington was close to Malcolm X's age when he was assassinated, both men were from large families, both of their fathers were ministers, and both were raised primarily by their mothers.

Malcolm X is the first non-documentary, and the first American film, to be given permission to film in Mecca (or within the Haram Sharif). A second unit film crew was hired to film in Mecca because non-Muslims, such as Lee, are not allowed inside the city. Lee fought very hard to get filming in Mecca but Warner Bros. initially refused to put up the money for location shooting. New Jersey was considered for filming the Mecca segments. In the end, Lee got money and permission together for filming in Mecca.

In addition to Nelson Mandela, the film featured cameos by Christopher Plummer (as the prison's Catholic chaplain), Peter Boyle (as a police officer), William Kunstler (as a judge), as well as activists Al Sharpton and Black Panther Party co-founder Bobby Seale (as street preachers).

The film was made shortly after Mandela's 1990 release from prison and during the negotiations to end apartheid in South Africa. Lee explained that he made "the connection between Soweto and Harlem, Nelson and Malcolm, and what Malcolm talked about: pan-Africanism, trying to build these bridges between people of color. He is alive in children in classrooms in Harlem, in classrooms in Soweto." Mandela ends the film with a quote from Malcolm X himself. The quote goes: "We declare our right on this earth, to be a human being, to be respected as a human being, to be given the rights of a human being, in this society, on this earth, in this day, which we intend to bring into existence by any means necessary." However, Mandela himself refused to utter it out loud, fearing that the Apartheid government would use it against him if he did. The final seconds of the film feature black-and-white footage of Malcolm X himself delivering the phrase.

== Release and reception ==
External videos
- "Malcolm X, The Movie: Cinema as History", panel discussion at the American University School of Communication, March 1, 1993 C-SPAN

Malcolm X was released in North America on November 18, 1992. The film released overseas in 1993, between February and March in Europe.

=== Home media ===
Malcolm X was released by The Criterion Collection on Ultra HD Blu-ray and Blu-ray Disc on November 22, 2022.

=== Box office ===
In the United States and Canada, the film grossed $9.9 million in its opening weekend, finishing third after Home Alone 2: Lost in New York ($30 million) and Bram Stoker's Dracula ($15 million). According to Box Office Mojo, the film ended its domestic run with a gross of $48,169,910. Due to the budget issues and costs of promotion, Warner Bros. claimed the film lost over $30 million in 1992.

Upon its United Kingdom release in 1993, it grossed £2,140,598 ($3,209,292). The film also sold 594,984 tickets in France, 127,306 tickets in Germany, and 133,798 tickets in Spain. In South Korea, it sold 28,159 tickets in the capital city of Seoul. The film grossed $24,933,000 internationally in its original release, for a worldwide total of $73,102,910.

=== Critical response ===
On review aggregator Rotten Tomatoes the film holds an approval rating of 89% based on 79 reviews, with an average rating of 7.8/10. The critics' consensus states: "Anchored by a powerful performance from Denzel Washington, Spike Lee's biopic of the legendary civil rights leader brings his autobiography to life with an epic sweep and a nuanced message." On Metacritic, the film holds a weighted average score of 73 out of 100, based on 15 critics, indicating "generally favorable reviews". Audiences polled by CinemaScore gave the film an average grade of "A" on an A+ to F scale.

Critic Roger Ebert of The Chicago Sun-Times ranked the film No. 1 on his Top 10 list for 1992 and described the film as "one of the great screen biographies, celebrating the sweep of an American life that bottomed out in prison before its hero reinvented himself." In 1999, Ebert and director Martin Scorsese, the latter sitting in for Ebert's late co-host Gene Siskel, both ranked Malcolm X among the ten best films of the 1990s.

However, bell hooks was much less favorable. In her essay, "Spike Lee Doing Malcolm X: Denying Black Pain", hooks argues that Lee's "film does not compel viewers to confront, challenge, and change. It embraces and rewards passive response – inaction. It encourages us to weep, but not to fight."

African-American experimental filmmaker Robert Banks's mixed media film essay, X: The Baby Cinema, a 4.5 minute, 16 mm short film made in the same year which chronicled the commercial appropriation of the image of Malcolm X, was met with disdain from Spike.

=== Accolades ===
Denzel Washington's portrayal was widely praised and he was nominated for the Academy Award for Best Actor. Washington lost to Al Pacino (for Scent of a Woman), a decision which Lee criticized.

In 2010, Malcolm X was selected for preservation in the United States National Film Registry by the Library of Congress as being "culturally, historically, or aesthetically significant".

Award	Category	Nominee(s)	Result	Ref.
Academy Awards	Best Actor	Denzel Washington	Nominated	
Academy Awards	Best Costume Design	Ruth E. Carter	Nominated	
Artios Awards	Best Casting for Feature Film – Drama	Robi Reed	Won	
Berlin International Film Festival	Golden Bear	Spike Lee	Nominated	
Berlin International Film Festival	Best Actor	Denzel Washington	Won	
Boston Society of Film Critics Awards	Best Actor	Denzel Washington	Won	
Chicago Film Critics Association Awards	Best Film		Won	
Chicago Film Critics Association Awards	Best Director	Spike Lee	Won	
Chicago Film Critics Association Awards	Best Actor	Denzel Washington	Won	
Chicago Film Critics Association Awards	Best Supporting Actor	Al Freeman Jr.	Nominated	
Chicago Film Critics Association Awards	Best Screenplay	Arnold Perl and Spike Lee	Nominated	
Chicago Film Critics Association Awards	Most Promising Actress	Angela Bassett	Nominated	
Dallas–Fort Worth Film Critics Association Awards	Best Film		Nominated	
Dallas–Fort Worth Film Critics Association Awards	Best Actor	Denzel Washington	Won	
Golden Globe Awards	Best Actor in a Motion Picture – Drama	Denzel Washington	Nominated	
Kansas City Film Critics Circle Awards	Best Actor	Denzel Washington	Won	
Los Angeles Film Critics Association Awards	Best Actor	Denzel Washington	Runner-up	
MTV Movie Awards	Best Movie		Nominated	
MTV Movie Awards	Best Male Performance	Denzel Washington	Won	
MTV Video Music Awards	Best Video from a Film	"Revolution" – Arrested Development	Nominated	
NAACP Image Awards	Outstanding Motion Picture		Won	
NAACP Image Awards	Outstanding Actor in a Motion Picture	Denzel Washington	Won	
NAACP Image Awards	Outstanding Supporting Actor in a Motion Picture	Al Freeman Jr.	Won	
NAACP Image Awards	Outstanding Supporting Actor in a Motion Picture	Delroy Lindo	Nominated	
NAACP Image Awards	Outstanding Supporting Actress in a Motion Picture	Angela Bassett	Won	
National Board of Review Awards	Top Ten Films		10th Place	
National Film Preservation Board	National Film Registry		Inducted	
National Society of Film Critics Awards	Best Actor	Denzel Washington	3rd Place	
National Society of Film Critics Awards	Best Supporting Actor	Delroy Lindo	3rd Place	
New York Film Critics Circle Awards	Best Actor	Denzel Washington	Won	
Political Film Society Awards	Exposé		Nominated	
Southeastern Film Critics Association Awards	Best Picture		5th Place	
Southeastern Film Critics Association Awards	Best Actor	Denzel Washington	Won	
USC Scripter Awards		Arnold Perl and Spike Lee (screenwriters); Malcolm X and Alex Haley (authors)	Nominated	

== See also ==
- Civil rights movement in popular culture
- List of black Academy Award winners and nominees
- List of black Golden Globe Award winners and nominees
- List of cult films
- List of Islam-related films
