= List of awards and nominations received by Alfre Woodard =

List of Alfre Woodard awards
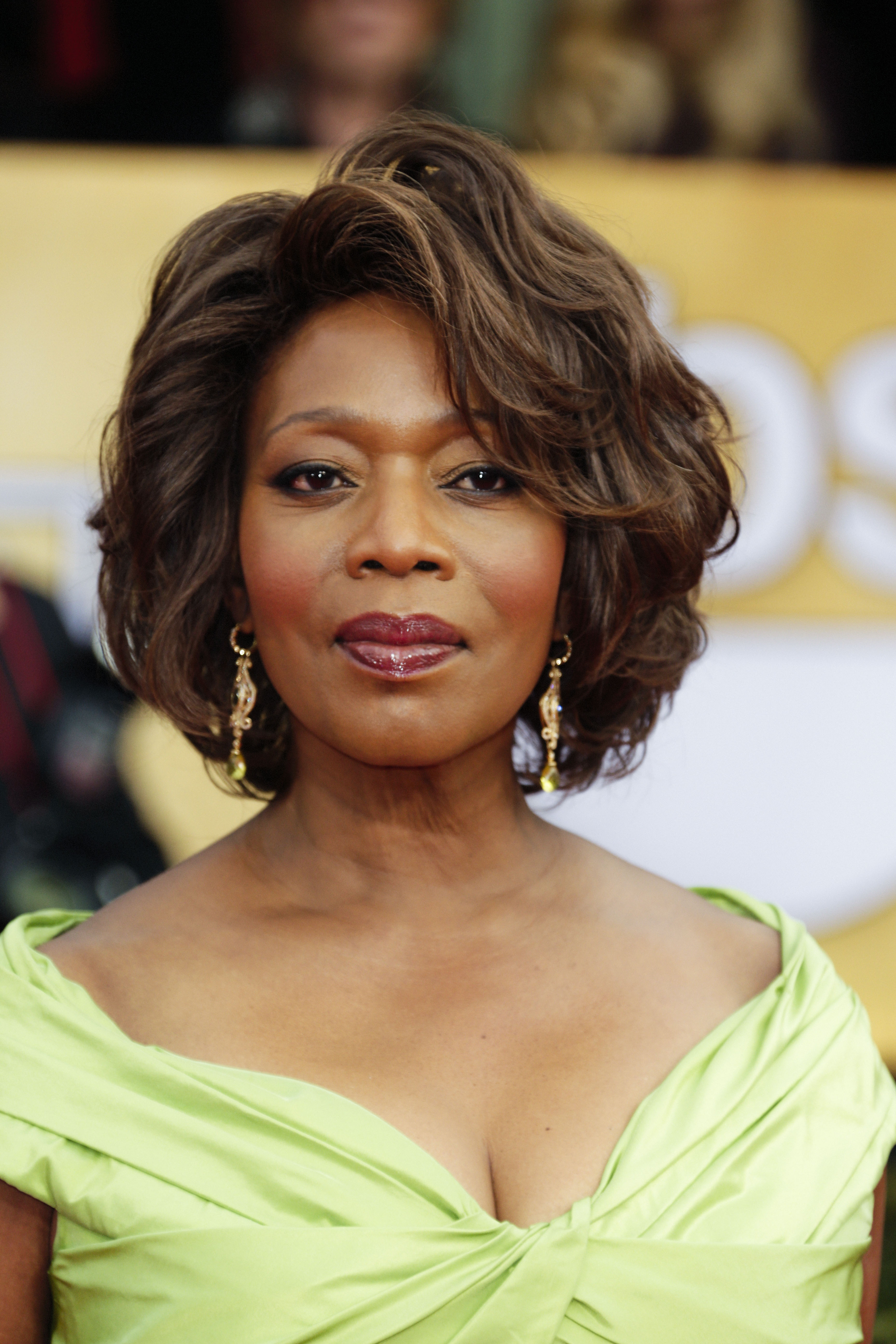
- Woodard at the Screen Actors Guild Awards in 2013
Award	Wins	Nominations
Academy Awards	0	1
BAFTA Awards	0	1
Golden Globe Awards	1	3
Grammy Awards	0	2
Primetime Emmy Awards	4	18
Screen Actors Guild Award	3	7

Alfre Woodard is an American actress and producer. She has been nominated once for an Academy Award, twice for a Grammy Award and 18 times for an Emmy Award (winning four) and has also won a Golden Globe Award and three Screen Actors Guild Awards. In 2020, The New York Times ranked Woodard seventeenth on its list of "The 25 Greatest Actors of the 21st Century". She is also known for her work as a political activist and producer. Woodard is a founder of Artists for a New South Africa. She is a board member of the Academy of Motion Picture Arts and Sciences.

== Major associations ==
=== Academy Awards ===
Year	Category	Nominated work	Result	Ref.
1983	Best Supporting Actress	Cross Creek	Nominated	

=== BAFTA Awards ===
Year	Category	Nominated work	Result	Ref.
British Academy Film Awards
2020	Best Actress in a Leading Role	Clemency	Nominated	

=== Golden Globe Award ===
Year	Category	Nominated work	Result	Ref.
1993	Best Supporting Actress – Motion Picture	Passion Fish	Nominated	
1997	Best Actress – Miniseries or Television Film	Miss Evers' Boys	Won	
2000	Best Actress – Miniseries or Television Film	Holiday Heart	Nominated	

=== Grammy Award ===
Year	Category	Nominated work	Result	Ref.
1997	Best Spoken Word Album	Grow Old Along with Me, the Best Is Yet to Be	Nominated	
2010	Best Spoken Word Album for Children	Nelson Mandela's Favorite African Folktales (producer)	Nominated	

=== Emmy Awards ===
Year	Category	Nominated work	Result	Ref.
Primetime Emmy Awards
1984	Outstanding Supporting Actress in a Drama Series	Hill Street Blues: Doris in Wonderland	Won	
1985	Outstanding Supporting Actress in a Miniseries or a Movie	Words By Heart Wonderworks	Nominated	
1986	Outstanding Lead Actress in a Drama Series	St. Elsewhere	Nominated	
1987	Outstanding Lead Actress in a Miniseries or a Movie	Unnatural Causes	Nominated	
1987	Outstanding Guest Actress in a Drama Series	L.A. Law: Pilot	Won	
1988	Outstanding Guest Actress in a Drama Series	St. Elsewhere: The Abby Singer Show	Nominated	
1990	Outstanding Lead Actress in a Miniseries or a Movie	A Mother's Courage: The Mary Thomas Story	Nominated	
1995	Outstanding Lead Actress in a Miniseries or a Movie	The Piano Lesson	Nominated	
1996	Outstanding Supporting Actress in a Miniseries or a Movie	Gulliver's Travels	Nominated	
1997	Outstanding Lead Actress in a Miniseries or a Movie	Miss Evers' Boys	Won	
1998	Outstanding Guest Actress in a Drama Series	Homicide: Life on the Street: Mercy	Nominated	
2001	Outstanding Performer in a Children's Special	The Wishing Tree	Nominated	
2003	Outstanding Guest Actress in a Drama Series	The Practice	Won	
2006	Outstanding Supporting Actress in a Miniseries or a Movie	The Water Is Wide	Nominated	
2006	Outstanding Supporting Actress in a Comedy Series	Desperate Housewives	Nominated	
2008	Outstanding Supporting Actress in a Miniseries or a Movie	Pictures of Hollis Woods	Nominated	
2011	Outstanding Guest Actress in a Drama Series	True Blood	Nominated	
2013	Outstanding Supporting Actress in a Miniseries or a Movie	Steel Magnolias	Nominated	

=== Screen Actors Guild Award ===
Year	Category	Nominated work	Result	Ref.
1995	Outstanding Actress in a Miniseries or TV Movie	The Piano Lesson	Won	
1995	Outstanding Ensemble Cast in a Motion Picture	How to Make an American Quilt	Nominated	
1997	Outstanding Actress in a Miniseries or TV Movie	Miss Evers' Boys	Won	
2005	Outstanding Ensemble Cast in a Comedy Series	Desperate Housewives	Won	
2006	Outstanding Ensemble Cast in a Comedy Series	Desperate Housewives	Nominated	
2012	Outstanding Actress in a Miniseries or TV Movie	Steel Magnolias	Nominated	
2013	Outstanding Ensemble Cast in a Motion Picture	12 Years a Slave	Nominated	

=== Independent Spirit Awards ===
Year	Category	Nominated work	Result	Ref.
1993	Best Supporting Female	Passion Fish	Won	
1999	Best Female Lead	Down in the Delta	Nominated	
2020	Best Female Lead	Clemency	Nominated	

== Other awards ==
=== Black Reel Awards ===
Year	Category	Nominated work	Result
2000	Best Actress	Funny Valentines	Nominated
2008	Best Actress	The Family That Preys	Nominated
2010	Best Ensemble	American Violet	Nominated
2010	Best Supporting Actress	American Violet	Nominated
2013	Best Supporting Actress	Steel Magnolias	Won
2014	Best Ensemble	12 Years a Slave	Nominated

=== NAACP Image Award ===
Year	Category	Nominated work	Result
1989	Outstanding Lead Actress in a Drama Series, Mini-Series or Television Movie	Unnatural Causes	Won
1990	Outstanding Lead Actress in a Drama Series, Mini-Series or Television Movie	Mandela	Won
1992	Outstanding Lead Actress in a Drama Series, Mini-Series or Television Movie	A Mother's Courage: The Mary Thomas Story The Magi	Won
1993	Outstanding Supporting Actress in a Motion Picture	Passion Fish	Nominated
1996	Outstanding Lead Actress in a Drama Series, Mini-Series or Television Movie	The Piano Lesson	Won
1996	Outstanding Supporting Actress in a Motion Picture	How to Make an American Quilt	Nominated
1997	Outstanding Supporting Actress in a Motion Picture	Star Trek: First Contact	Nominated
1998	Outstanding Actress in a Television Movie, Mini-Series or Dramatic Special	Miss Evers' Boys	Won
1999	Outstanding Actress in a Motion Picture	Down in the Delta	Nominated
2001	Outstanding Performance in a Youth/Children's Series or Special	The Wishing Tree	Nominated
2001	Outstanding Supporting Actress in a Motion Picture	Love & Basketball	Won
2001	Outstanding Actress in a Television Movie, Mini-Series or Dramatic Special	Holiday Heart	Nominated
2002	Outstanding Actress in a Motion Picture	K-PAX	Nominated
2004	Outstanding Supporting Actress in a Motion Picture	Radio	Won
2009	Outstanding Actress in a Motion Picture	The Family That Preys	Nominated
2009	Outstanding Supporting Actress in a Drama Series	My Own Worst Enemy	Nominated
2010	Outstanding Supporting Actress in a Motion Picture	American Violet	Nominated
2010	Outstanding Supporting Actress in a Drama Series	Memphis Beat	Nominated
2012	Outstanding Supporting Actress in a Drama Series	Memphis Beat	Nominated
2013	Outstanding Actress in a Television Movie, Mini-Series or Dramatic Special	Steel Magnolias	Won
2014	Outstanding Supporting Actress in a Motion Picture	12 Years a Slave	Nominated
2015	Outstanding Supporting Actress in a Drama Series	State of Affairs	Nominated

=== Satellite Awards ===
Year	Category	Nominated work	Result
1997	Best Supporting Actress	Gulliver's Travels	Nominated
1998	Best Actress – Miniseries or Television Film	Miss Evers' Boys	Won

== Film critic awards ==
Year	Award	Category	Nominated work	Result
1992	Los Angeles Film Critics Association Award	Best Actress	Passion Fish	2nd place
1992	New York Film Critics Circle Awards	Best Supporting Actress	Passion Fish	3rd place
1999	Acapulco Black Film Festival	Best Actress	Down in the Delta	Nominated
2013	Critics' Choice Television Award	Best Supporting Actress in a Miniseries or a Movie	Steel Magnolias	Nominated
2013	Washington D.C. Area Film Critics Association Award	Best Ensemble	12 Years a Slave	Won
2013	Southeastern Film Critics Association	Best Ensemble	12 Years a Slave	Nominated
2013	San Diego Film Critics Society	Best Ensemble	12 Years a Slave	Nominated
2013	Phoenix Film Critics Society	Best Ensemble	12 Years a Slave	Nominated
2013	Detroit Film Critics Society	Best Ensemble	12 Years a Slave	Nominated
2013	Boston Online Film Critics Association	Best Ensemble	12 Years a Slave	Won
2014	Georgia Film Critics Association	Best Ensemble	12 Years a Slave	Nominated

== Miscellaneous awards ==
Year	Award	Category	Nominated work	Result	Ref.
1989	Joe A. Callaway Award	Best Actress	The Winter's Tale	Won	
1989	CableACE Awards	Actress in a Movie or Miniseries	Mandela	Won	
1994	Saturn Award	Best Supporting Actress	Heart and Souls	Nominated	
1995	Women in Film Crystal Awards	Life Achievement Award		Won	
1997	CableACE Awards	Supporting Actress in a Movie or Miniseries	The Member of the Wedding	Nominated	
1997	CableACE Awards	Actress in a Movie or Miniseries	Miss Evers' Boys	Won	
2006	BET Awards	Best Actress	Something New	Nominated	
2011	Gracie Allen Awards	Outstanding Supporting Actress in a Drama Series or Special	Memphis Beat (listed as Delta Blues)	Won	
2014	Oklahoma Hall of Fame			Inducted	
2019	Gotham Awards	Best Actress	Clemency	Nominated	
2023	Canadian Screen Awards	Best Performance in a Guest Role in a Drama Series	The Porter	Won	
