= Alfre Woodard =

American actress (born 1952)

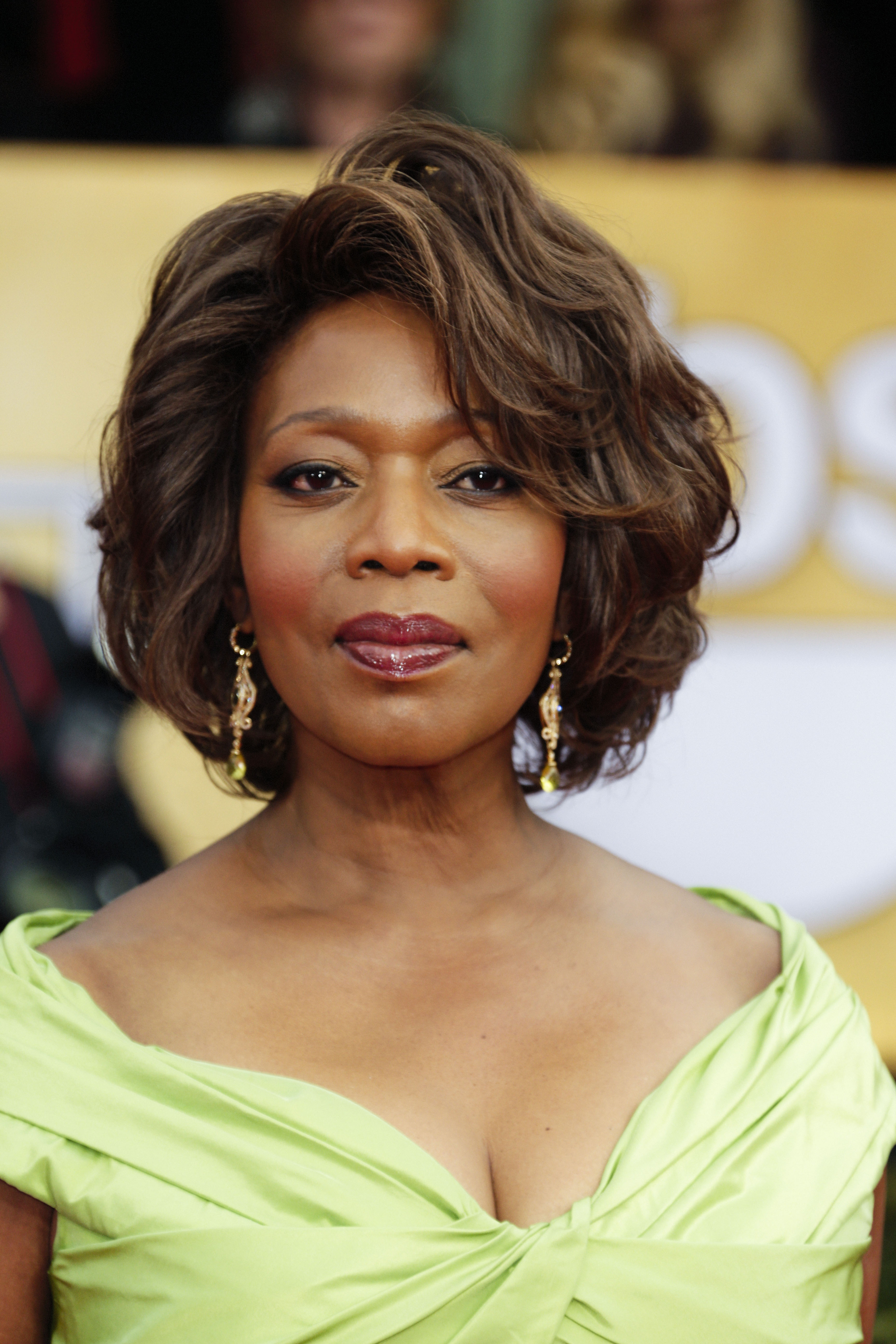
- Woodard at the 19th Screen Actors Guild Awards in 2013
- Born: November 8, 1952 (age 74); Tulsa, Oklahoma, U.S.
- Education: Boston University (BFA)
- Occupations: Actress; producer
- Years active: 1973–present
- Political party: Democratic
- Spouse: Roderick Spencer (m. 1983)
- Children: 2
- Awards: Full list

Alfre LaWanda Jeen Woodard (/ˈælfri ˈwʊdərd/ AL-free WUUD-ərd; born November 8, 1952) is an American actress and producer. Known for portraying strong-willed and dignified roles on stage and screen, she has received various accolades, including four Emmy Awards, a Golden Globe Award, and three Screen Actors Guild Awards as well as nominations for an Academy Award, BAFTA Award, and two Grammy Awards. In 2020, The New York Times ranked her as one of "The 25 Greatest Actors of the 21st Century". She is a board member of the Academy of Motion Picture Arts and Sciences.

Woodard began her acting career in theater, starring in So Nice, They Named It Twice, and breaking through by originating the role of “woman who lost her stuff” in the Off-Broadway play For Colored Girls Who Have Considered Suicide / When the Rainbow Is Enuf (1977). She received an Academy Award for Best Supporting Actress nomination for her role in Cross Creek (1983). She earned a BAFTA Award for Best Actress nomination for her role in Clemency (2019). Woodard's notable films include Grand Canyon (1991), Passion Fish (1992), Heart and Souls (1993), Crooklyn (1994), How to Make an American Quilt (1995), Primal Fear (1996), Star Trek: First Contact (1996), Down in the Delta (1998), 12 Years a Slave (2013), and Juanita (2019). She voiced Sarabi in The Lion King (2019).

Woodard gained prominence for her television role as Dr. Roxanne Turner in the NBC medical drama St. Elsewhere, for which she was nominated for a Primetime Emmy Award for Outstanding Lead Actress in a Drama Series in 1986, and for Guest Actress in 1988. She's received four Primetime Emmy Awards for her roles in the NBC drama series Hill Street Blues in 1984, the NBC series L.A. Law in 1987, the HBO film Miss Evers' Boys (1997), and The Practice in 2003. From 2005 to 2006, Woodard starred as Betty Applewhite in the ABC comedy-drama series Desperate Housewives. In the Marvel Cinematic Universe (MCU), she portrayed "Black" Mariah Stokes-Dillard in the Netflix series Luke Cage (2016–2018).

She is also known for her work as a political activist and producer. Woodard is a founder of Artists for a New South Africa, an organization devoted to advancing democracy and equality in that country.

== Early life and education ==
Woodard was born in Tulsa, Oklahoma, to Constance, a homemaker, and Marion H. Woodard, an entrepreneur and interior designer. She is the youngest of three children and was a cheerleader in high school. Woodard attended Bishop Kelley High School, a private Catholic school in Tulsa, graduating from there in 1970. She studied drama at Boston University, from which she graduated. In 2004, she received an honorary doctoral degree in fine arts (DFA) from Boston University.

== Career ==
=== 1970s ===
Woodard made her professional theater debut in 1974 on Washington, DC's Arena Stage. On off-Broadway, she performed in the play So Nice, They Named it Twice at The Public Theater in early 1976. In 1976, she moved to Los Angeles. She later said, "When I came to L.A., people told me there were no film roles for black actors. I'm not a fool. I know that. But I was always confident that I knew my craft." Her breakthrough role was in the Off-Broadway play For Colored Girls Who Have Considered Suicide When the Rainbow Is Enuf in 1977. The next year, Woodard made her film debut in Remember My Name, a thriller written and directed by Alan Rudolph. In the same year, she had a leading role in The Trial of the Moke, a Great Performances television film co-starring Samuel L. Jackson.

=== 1980s ===
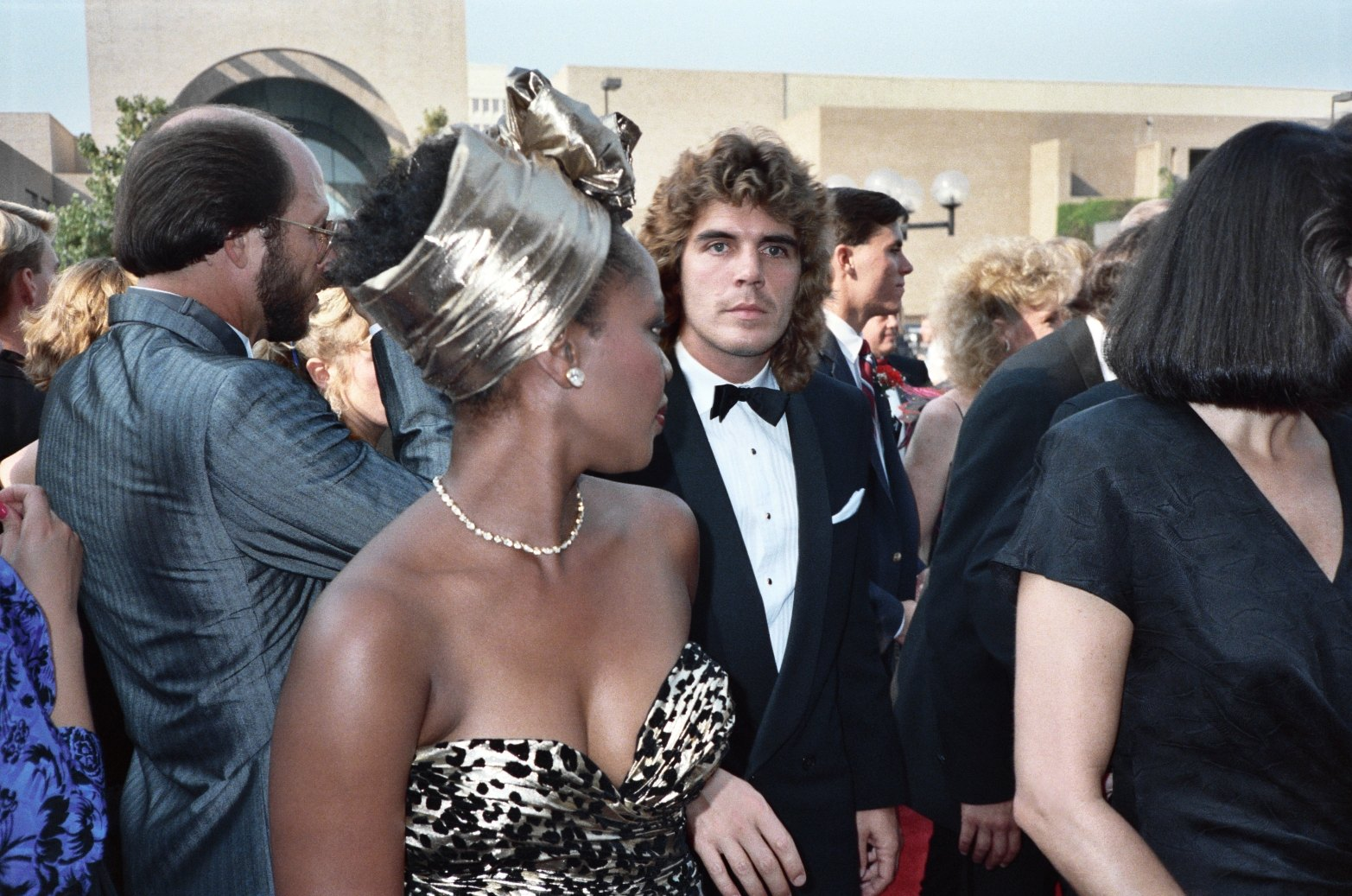
Woodard with her husband Roderick Spencer at the 1987 Emmy Awards.

In 1980, Woodard had a role in the ensemble comedy film Health directed by Robert Altman. She later appeared in the NBC miniseries The Sophisticated Gents, and had a regular role alongside Catherine Hicks and Tim Matheson in the short-lived comedy-drama Tucker's Witch (1982–83). Later in 1983, Woodard starred opposite Mary Steenburgen in the biography drama film Cross Creek directed by Martin Ritt. For her performance in the film, she was nominated for the Academy Award for Best Supporting Actress. Later in 1983, Woodard won her first Primetime Emmy Award in the Outstanding Supporting Actress in a Drama Series category for her three-episode arc as Doris Robson in the NBC critically acclaimed serial drama Hill Street Blues. Her next television role was on the short-lived NBC sitcom Sara starring Geena Davis. In the next few years, Woodard received critical acclaim for her lead performances in a number of made-for-television films. She was nominated for Primetime Emmy Awards for her roles in the films Words by Heart (1985), Unnatural Causes (1986), and A Mother's Courage: The Mary Thomas Story (1989).

In 1986, Woodard starred opposite Farrah Fawcett in the drama film Extremities, which was based on the 1982 Off-Broadway play by William Mastrosimone. She won a Primetime Emmy Award for Outstanding Guest Actress in a Drama Series for her performance as a woman dying of leukemia in the pilot episode of the NBC drama series L.A. Law. From 1985 to 1986, she also was a regular cast member of the NBC medical drama St. Elsewhere. She played the role of Dr. Roxanne Turner, a strong doctor and the love interest of the Denzel Washington character. She left the show after a single season and guest-starred in 1988. Woodard was nominated for a Primetime Emmy Award for Outstanding Lead Actress in a Drama Series in 1986, and for Outstanding Guest Actress in a Drama Series in 1988, for St. Elsewhere. In 1998, Woodard reprised the role for a sixth-season episode of Homicide: Life on the Street entitled "Mercy". She also was nominated for a Primetime Emmy Award for her guest performance in the show.

In 1987, Woodard played the role of South African activist Winnie Mandela in the HBO film Mandela. She spent several weeks watching news clips and listening to tapes of Winnie to match her accent. She did not win an Emmy, but received a CableACE Award and an NAACP Image Award in the Outstanding Lead Actress category for Mandela. In the next years, she began starring in comedy films like Scrooged (1988) and Miss Firecracker (1989).

=== 1990s ===
In 1991, Woodard co-starred in drama film Grand Canyon, directed by Lawrence Kasdan. The film received generally positive reviews from critics and earned $40,991,329 at the box office. The next year, Woodard received major critical acclaim for her performance opposite Mary McDonnell in the drama film Passion Fish, written and directed by John Sayles. The film depicts the struggles of a recently paralyzed daytime soap opera star, and how her outlook is influenced by her nurse, Chantelle, a recovering drug addict played by Woodard. The Rolling Stone's Peter Travers described her performance as "superb". She was a promising contender for an Academy Award for Best Supporting Actress category, but did not receive a nomination. However, she did receive her first Golden Globe Award nomination for Best Supporting Actress, and won an Independent Spirit Award for Best Supporting Female. In that same year, she had a comedic role in the fantasy film Heart and Souls opposite Robert Downey, Jr., for which she was nominated for a Saturn Award for Best Supporting Actress.

Woodard starred opposite Danny Glover in the 1993 drama film Bopha! and had the leading role in 1994's semi-autobiographical film Crooklyn, written and directed by Spike Lee. Crooklyn received very positive reviews from critics. During the same period, Woodward also appeared in the films The Gun in Betty Lou's Handbag (1992), Rich in Love (1993), and Blue Chips (1994). She was considered for the role of Mia Wallace in Pulp Fiction (1994), which ultimately went to Uma Thurman.

In 1995, she co-starred alongside Winona Ryder, Anne Bancroft, Ellen Burstyn, Kate Nelligan, and Maya Angelou in the female ensemble drama film How to Make an American Quilt, for which the entire cast was nominated for the Screen Actors Guild Award for Outstanding Performance by a Cast in a Motion Picture. In 1996, Woodard played Judge Miriam Shoat in the neo-noir crime film Primal Fear with Richard Gere and Edward Norton, as well as portraying Lily Sloane, Zefram Cochrane's assistant in the science fiction film Star Trek: First Contact. Her performance in the franchise film garnered wide critical acclaim. In 1998, she starred as an alcoholic single mother from Chicago forced to spend a summer with her uncle in Mississippi, in the critically acclaimed independent drama Down in the Delta directed by Maya Angelou, her How to Make an American Quilt co-star. For her powerful performance in the film, Woodard was nominated for an Independent Spirit Award for Best Female Lead. In 1999, Woodard had roles in two films: Mumford (alongside her Passion Fish co-star Mary McDonnell), and The Wishing Tree as lead character.

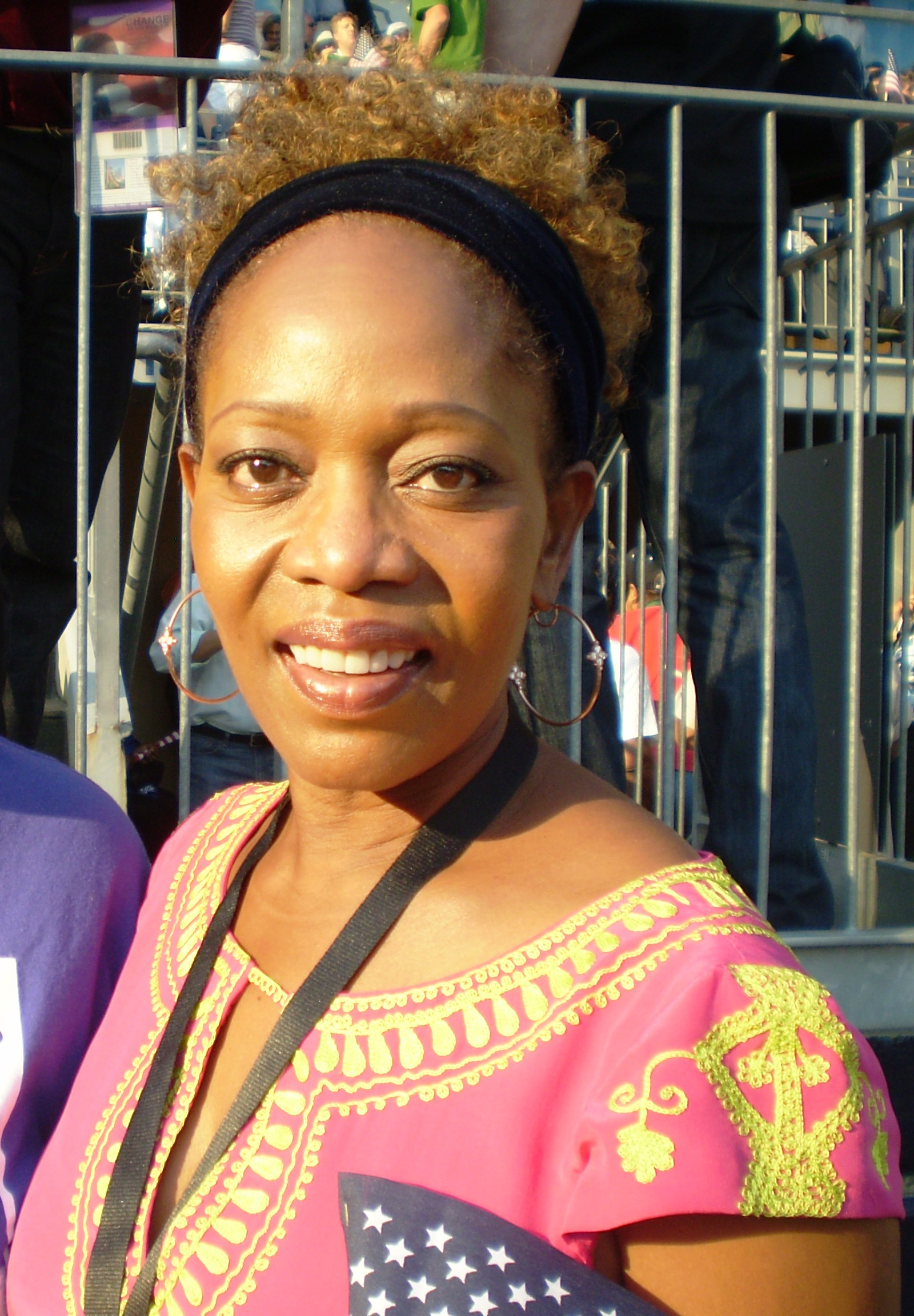
Woodard at Obama Rally during the Democratic National Convention in 2008

In the 1990s, Woodard also continued her work in television, earning considerable acclaim for her performances. For The Piano Lesson (1995), a Hallmark Hall of Fame film, she won her first Screen Actors Guild Award for Outstanding Performance by a Female Actor in a Miniseries or Television Movie, as well as being nominated for another Primetime Emmy Award for Outstanding Lead Actress in a Miniseries or a Movie. In next year, she received a Primetime Emmy nomination for her performance as the Queen in the critically acclaimed Hallmark miniseries Gulliver's Travels, based on the classic Jonathan Swift novel. In 1997, she had the leading roles in both The Member of the Wedding (based on the novel by Carson McCullers) and Miss Evers' Boys on HBO. Her performance as the title character in the latter film, as a nurse who consoled many of the subjects of the notorious 1930s Tuskegee study of untreated Blacks with syphilis, earned widespread critical acclaim, sweeping all television awards in the Outstanding Lead Actress in a Miniseries or Movie category, including Primetime Emmy (besting nominees Meryl Streep, Helen Mirren, Glenn Close, and Stockard Channing), Golden Globe, Satellite, NAACP, CableACE, and Screen Actors Guild Awards.

=== 2000s ===
In the 2000s, Woodard's film career showcased her versatility in a range of genres, including the ensemble comedy-drama What's Cooking? (2000), the romantic drama Love & Basketball (2000) as the lead character's mother, science fiction films K-PAX (2001), The Core (2003), and The Forgotten (2004), the biographical drama Radio (2003), comedies The Singing Detective (2003) and Beauty Shop (2005), the romantic drama Something New (2006), and the dance-musical Take the Lead (2006). Woodard also was nominated for a Golden Globe Award for her performance as a drug addict in the Holiday Heart (2000). In addition, she performed voice work in a variety of feature and television documentaries, as well as a voice role in Walt Disney's Dinosaur. The film was a financial success, grossing over $349 million worldwide.

On television, Woodard guest-starred in two episodes of The Practice in 2003, for which she won her fourth Primetime Emmy Award. In 2005, she joined the cast of the ABC comedy-drama series Desperate Housewives as Betty Applewhite, the new mystery housewife. Her character was introduced in the last episodes of the series' first season, and became the center of the second season's mystery. Series creator Marc Cherry noted: "There's nothing strategically black about her character. Her color is incidental." Woodard stated that she had never seen the show before being offered the role, leading the producers to send her fifteen episodes of the show, which she divided amongst various family members. After they compared storylines, Woodard recalled that she became "instantly hooked" on the series. As soon as Woodard accepted the role of Betty Applewhite, she reported experiencing heavy media attention. Woodard's portrayal of Betty was praised and resulted in a nomination for the Primetime Emmy Award for Outstanding Supporting Actress in a Comedy Series in 2006. However, her mystery as a whole had mixed reviews. In a review of the second-season premiere, Michael Slezak of Entertainment Weekly thought that the Applewhite mystery would help reduce the show's chances of falling into a sophomore slump. He praised Woodard's acting as well as her character's storyline, opining, "there's something so inherently warm and maternal in Woodard's performance, such apple-pie wholesomeness, that it makes her touches of menace all the more chilling." However, as the season progressed, there were many complaints about Betty's lack of interaction with the other housewives. She left the series in the second-season finale episode.

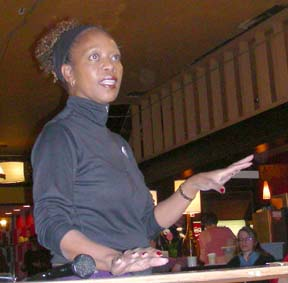
Woodard stumps for Barack Obama in New Philadelphia, Ohio in 2008

Woodard was nominated for Primetime Emmys for her roles in the television films The Water Is Wide and Pictures of Hollis Woods (2007). She starred as lead in the Tyler Perry's drama film The Family That Preys in 2008. The film received mixed reviews from critics, but her performance received acclaim. Los Angeles Times critic Bob Baker said in his review: "The film takes off when Woodard's and Kathy Bates' characters go on a Thelma & Louise-style road trip.", while The Washington Post's Neely Tucker wrote: "By far the best thing about the enterprise is Woodard. If she's not in this thing, I think it goes kaput.". In next year, she appeared in the independent drama American Violet, playing the mother of a 24-year-old African-American woman wrongfully swept up in a drug raid. She also starred in two short-lived television series: NBC's My Own Worst Enemy (2008), and CBS's Three Rivers (2009).

=== 2010s ===
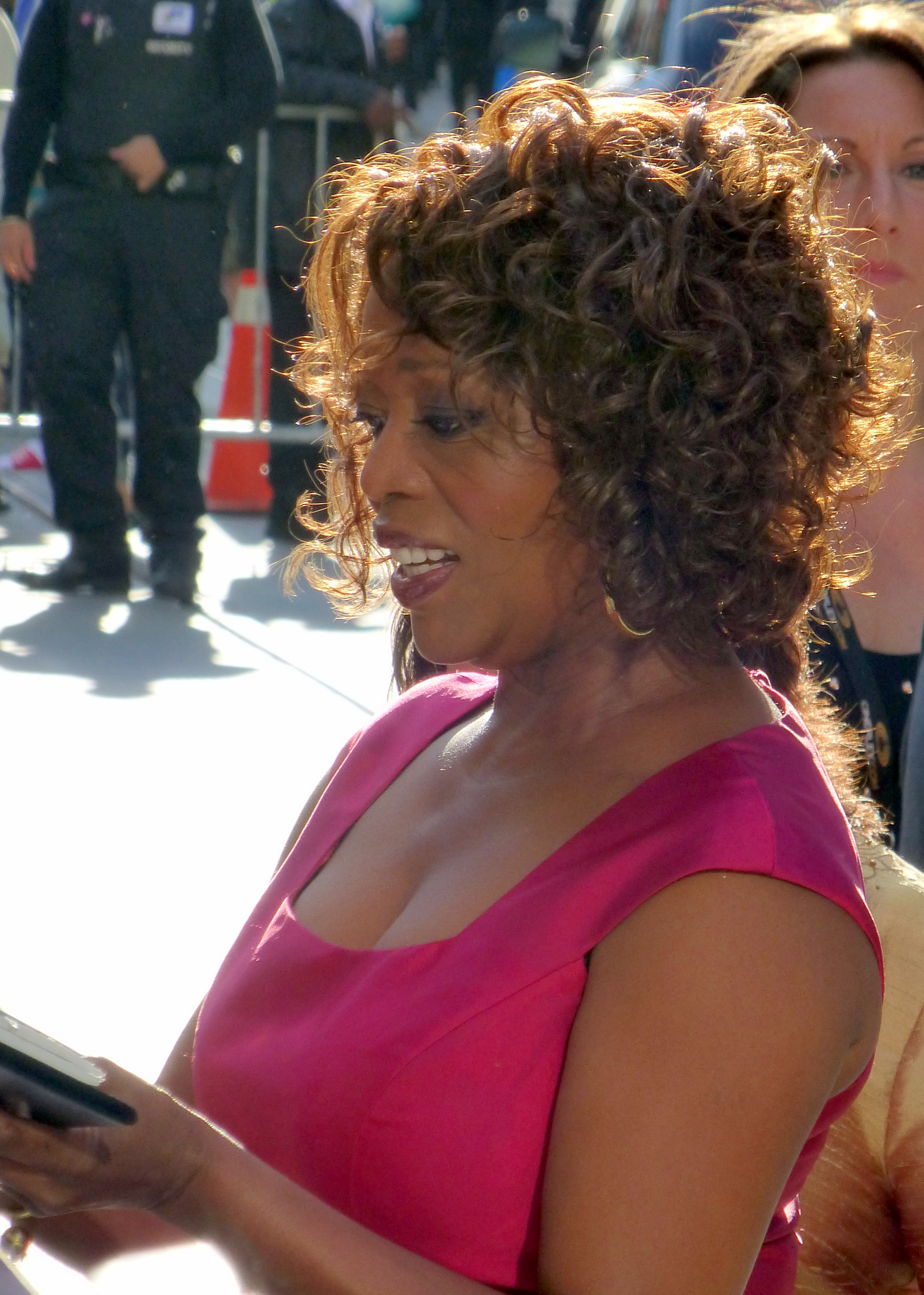
Woodard at the premiere of 12 Years a Slave at the 2013 Toronto Film Festival

From 2010 to 2011, Woodard starred as Lt. Tanya Rice in the TNT comedy-drama series Memphis Beat, winning a Gracie Allen Award for each of its two seasons. One critic said: "I originally tuned in for Jason Lee, who plays a police detective named Dwight who likes to croon the blues. But I was won over by Alfre Woodard, who plays Dwight's by-the-book boss." Memphis Beat was canceled after two seasons. In 2010, she appeared in the third season of HBO's True Blood as Ruby Jean Reynolds. garnering another Primetime Emmy nomination in 2011 for her recurring role. Woodard also guest-starred in Shonda Rhimes' dramas Grey's Anatomy in 2011 and Private Practice in 2012. Also in 2012, Woodard appeared in the Lifetime television remake of the 1989 comedy-drama film Steel Magnolias as Ouiser, a role previously played by Shirley MacLaine. It drew 6.5 million viewers, making it the third most-viewed Lifetime Original film in the network's history. Woodard received critical acclaim for her comedic performance, as well as Primetime Emmy and Screen Actors Guild Awards nominations. In 2013, Woodard made Emmy history with 17 nominations for 16 different roles. Also in 2013, she had a recurring role in the BBC America period drama Copper.

In 2013, Woodard appeared in Steve McQueen's historical drama film 12 Years a Slave as Mistress Harriet Shaw, a formerly enslaved woman who has risen in the Southern caste system. Though her appearance was brief, her performance was praised as powerful. Along with the other cast members, she was nominated for the Screen Actors Guild Award for Outstanding Performance by a Cast in a Motion Picture, in addition to her nomination for an NAACP Image Award for Outstanding Supporting Actress in a Motion Picture for her single-scene appearance. In 2013, she also appeared in Ava DuVernay's short film The Door, a part of Miu Miu's Women's Tales series. The following year, Woodard appeared in the horror-thriller Annabelle and the comedy-drama Mississippi Grind. She also starred in the independent drama film Knucklehead as an abusive mother.

In 2014, Woodard played the role of the first female President of the United States in the NBC political drama series State of Affairs opposite Katherine Heigl. About her role, Woodard said, "It's fun to play the President, rather than to be the President. But what drew me was how smart the script was, and this world we hadn't seen before—this world most Americans didn't know existed before we went after Bin Laden. And that it was being done by people who knew the world. So we're not stepping too outside the boundaries; it's based in realism. And I love politics. I have worked in politics for several decades, so it was a chance to live in a world that was important to me." The series premiered with generally negative reviews from critics, but most reviewers praised Woodard's performance. Amy Amatangelo of Boston Herald gave the premiere grade "C", stating that, "Alfre Woodard isn't given a lot to do as President Constance Payton in the premiere, but, unlike Heigl, she does have the gravitas for the role, and the show would be wise to use her more. The series sets up some interesting reveals in the hour's final moments. They potentially could make the show more interesting. But for now the state of affairs is rather mediocre." The series was canceled after a single season.

In November 2014, Woodard was inducted into the Oklahoma Hall of Fame. She said in her acceptance speech that she believes it is her responsibility to use her fame to help others less fortunate. Also in November 2014, Woodard narrated "Women in Politics", an episode of season 2 of Makers: Women Who Make America.

Woodard played a lead role in So B. It (2016), the film adaptation of Sarah Weeks' young adult novel, directed by Stephen Gyllenhaal. She had a small role in Marvel's film Captain America: Civil War (2016), playing Miriam Sharpe, the mother of an American citizen killed in the battle of Sokovia. Later that year, she played "Black" Mariah Stokes Dillard in the Netflix series Marvel's Luke Cage, marking her second portrayal of a character in the Marvel Cinematic Universe.

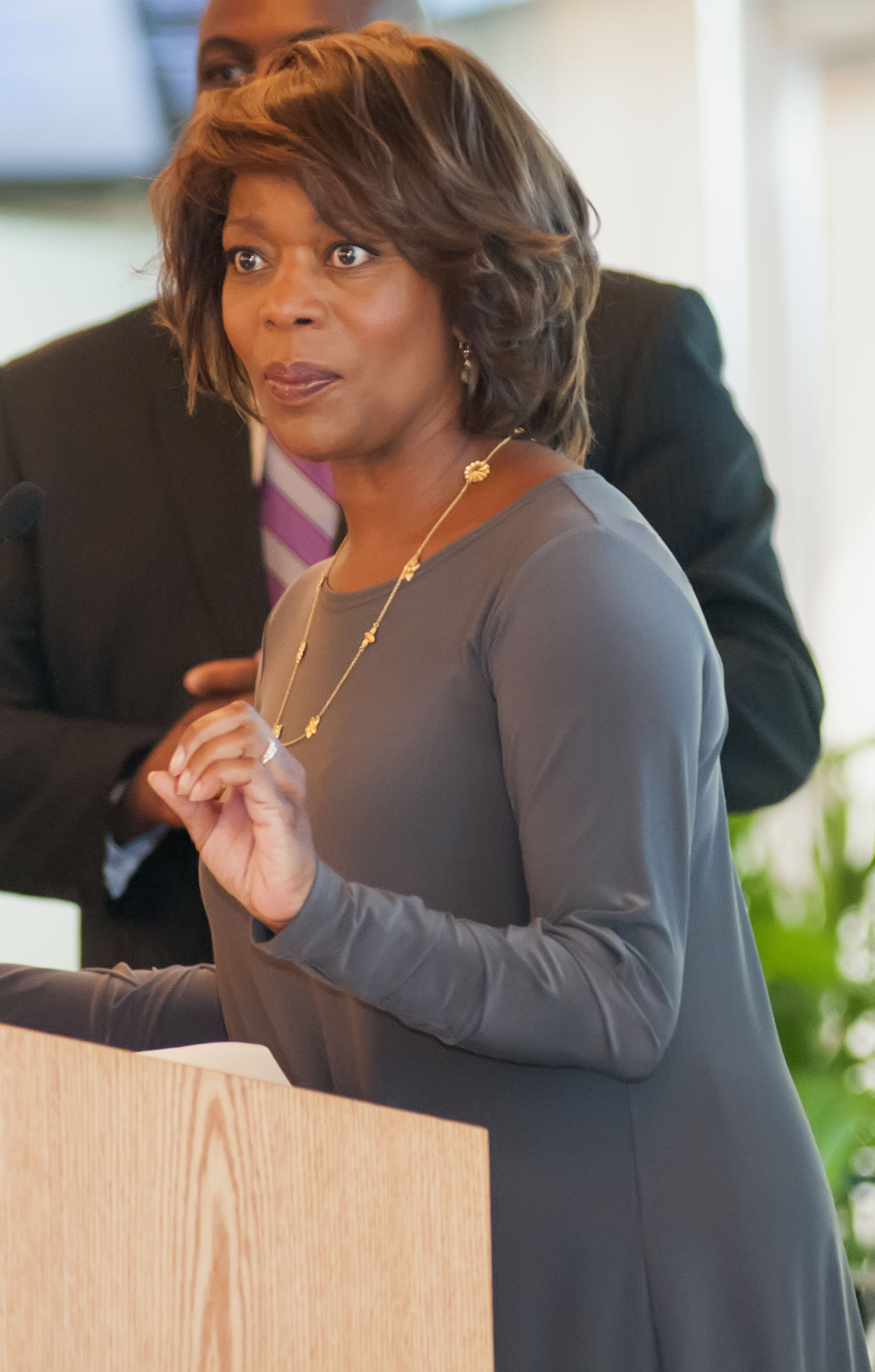
Woodard in Johnson C. Smith University in 2012

Woodard played the title character in Juanita (2019), an independent drama based on Sheila Williams' book Dancing on the Edge of the Roof. She also co-starred opposite Michelle Monaghan in Saint Judy. Additionally, Woodard appeared as Josephine Anwhistle in Netflix's adaptation of A Series of Unfortunate Events, which premiered in 2017. In 2018, she took a recurring role in the Fox prime time soap opera Empire, playing Renee, Cookie Lyon's mother.

In 2019, Woodard voiced Sarabi in the CGI live action remake of The Lion King, directed by Jon Favreau. Also that year, Woodard played in a leading role in the prison drama film Clemency, which premiered at the 2019 Sundance Film Festival. The film centers on a prison warden (Woodard) who confronts her own psychological demons as she develops an emotional connection to the death row inmate (played by Aldis Hodge) she is scheduled to execute. For her performance, Woodard has received wide critical acclaim. She was listed as a contender for a nomination in the 2020 Academy Award for Best Actress category, but did not receive a nomination. She received BAFTA Award for Best Actress in a Leading Role nomination for her performance. Also that year, Woodard began starring opposite Jason Momoa in the Apple TV+ original fantasy drama series See, a series set in a future in which the human race has lost the sense of sight.

=== 2020s ===
In 2021, Woodard starred opposite Kevin Hart in the drama film Fatherhood directed by Paul Weitz. The film received mixed reviews from critics, but was a hit on Netflix. A week after its release, Netflix reported the film was on track to by watched by 61 million households through its first month of release. She also appeared in the 2022 action thriller The Gray Man for Netflix, with a production budget of $200 million, making it the most expensive film made by Netflix. Also in 2022, she had a cameo role in the Kyra Sedgwick’s directorial debut, the romantic comedy film Space Oddity. Samantha Bergeson from IndieWire wrote in her review: "Alfre Woodard, too good for this film, graces us onscreen as a kind pediatrician who treats Alex because he acts like a little kid."

Woodard executive produced and co-starred in the CBC Television period drama miniseries The Porter, which premiered in 2022 to positive reviews and became the most nominated show at the 11th Canadian Screen Awards. Woodard received Canadian Screen Award for Best Performance in a Guest role in a Drama Series for The Porter.

Woodard next appeared in the 2024 film adaptation of 'Salem's Lot playing the role of Dr. Cody, and set to star alongside Morgan Freeman in Hate To See You Go. She starred opposite Blair Underwood in the thriller film Viral. Also that year, she starred in the epic film The Book of Clarence and the comedy film Summer Camp alongside Diane Keaton and Kathy Bates.

In 2024, Woodard reprised her role as Lily Sloane from Star Trek: First Contact in the penultimate episode of Star Trek: Lower Decks "Fissure Quest." Woodard played an alternate reality version of the character.

Woodard has announced that she is producing an upcoming four-hour television miniseries about Fannie Lou Hamer, a voting rights activist and civil rights leader. The project was first announced in 2014, and in November 2020, ABC Signature ordered it to series. As of 2023, the project still was not going to production.

In the Netflix science fiction series The Boroughs (2026), Woodward co-stars in the role of retired journalist Judy Daniel who investigates strange activities at her retirement community.

In 2026, she is set to join Joseph Gordon-Levitt’s AI Thriller for Netflix.

== Personal life ==
Woodard married writer Roderick Spencer on October 21, 1983, and they have two children, Mavis and Duncan. Her daughter, Mavis, served as Miss Golden Globe for the 2010 Golden Globe Awards. Woodard follows Christian Science.

Woodard is an activist for a wide spectrum of causes. She is a founder and board member of Artists for a New South Africa (1989-c.2014). Woodard is also a board member of the Democratic Party, and campaigned for Barack Obama in both the 2008 and 2012 presidential elections. She lends continuing support to the fight for LGBT rights and same sex marriage. In February 2009, she joined a group of American film directors and actors on a cultural trip to Iran at the invitation of the "House of Cinema" forum in Tehran.

On August 9, 2015, Woodard appeared on TLC's Who Do You Think You Are?. Research into her father's genealogy revealed that her great-grandfather Alex Woodard was born into slavery in Houston County, Georgia, in the early 1840s. At about age 14 or 15, Alex was separated from his family when his master relocated to Jackson Parish, Louisiana. Historians helped Woodard locate evidence that Alex was assessed for a poll tax in 1867, indicating that he was registered to vote two years after the Civil War ended. By 1881, Alex had purchased 80 acres (32 ha) of farmland in Jackson Parish. On April 15, 1898, Alex Woodard and his wife Elizabeth sold their 80 acres to her brother, Aaron Stell, as they had moved to Wharton County, Texas, by that time.

== Awards and nominations ==
Woodard has received numerous accolades including four Primetime Emmy Awards (tying the record for the most acting Emmys won by an African-American performer, along with Regina King), a Golden Globe Award, and three Screen Actors Guild Awards. She also has been nominated for an Academy Award, a BAFTA Award, and two Grammy Awards.

== Filmography ==
=== Film ===
Year	Title	Role	Notes	Ref.
1978	Remember My Name	Rita		
1980	Health	Sally Benbow		
1983	Cross Creek	Beatrice "Geechee"		
1984	Sweet Revenge	Vicki Teague		
1984	Killing Floor	Maddie Custer		
1986	Extremities	Patricia		
1988	Scrooged	Grace Cooley		
1989	Miss Firecracker	Popeye Jackson		
1990	Blue Bayou	Jessica Filley		
1991	Grand Canyon	Jane		
1991	Pretty Hattie's Baby	Hattie	Unreleased film; also associate producer	
1992	The Gun in Betty Lou's Handbag	Attorney Ann Orkin		
1992	Passion Fish	Chantelle		
1993	Rich in Love	Rhody Poole		
1993	Heart and Souls	Penny Washington		
1993	Bopha!	Rosie Mangena		
1994	Blue Chips	Lavada McRae		
1994	Crooklyn	Carolyn Carmichael		
1994	Countdown to Freedom: 10 Days That Changed South Africa	Narrator	Documentary film	
1995	How to Make an American Quilt	Marianna		
1996	Statistically Speaking	Middle aged woman	Short film	
1996	Follow Me Home	Evey	Unreleased film	
1996	Star Trek: First Contact	Lily Sloane		
1996	Primal Fear	Judge Miriam Shoat		
1996	A Step Toward Tomorrow	Dr. Sandlin		
1997	Cadillac Desert	Narrator		
1997	The Brave Little Toaster to the Rescue	Maisie	Voice role	
1998	Down in the Delta	Loretta Sinclair	Also executive producer	
1999	Funny Valentines	Joyce May	Also executive producer	
1999	The Wishing Tree	Clara Collier		
1999	Different Moms	Narrator	Documentary film	
1999	Mumford	Lily		
2000	What's Cooking?	Audrey Williams		
2000	Lost Souls	Dr. Allen	Cameo appearance	
2000	John Henry	Polly / Narrator		
2000	Love & Basketball	Camille Wright		
2000	Dinosaur	Plio	Voice role	
2001	K-PAX	Claudia Villars		
2001	American Exile	Narrator	Documentary film	
2002	Searching for Debra Winger	Herself	Documentary film	
2002	Baby of the Family	Rachel		
2002	The Wild Thornberrys Movie	Akela	Voice role	
2003	The Singing Detective	Chief of Staff		
2003	Nat Turner: A Troublesome Property	Narrator	Documentary film	
2003	The Core	Talma Stickley		
2003	Unchained Memories	Narrator		
2003	Radio	Principal Daniels		
2004	The Forgotten	Detective Anne Pope		
2004	All Our Sons: Fallen Heroes of 9/11	Narrator	Documentary film	
2005	Beauty Shop	Miss Josephine		
2006	Something New	Joyce McQueen		
2006	Take the Lead	Principal Augustine James		
2006	King Leopold's Ghost	Ilanga	Voice role	
2008	American Violet	Alma Roberts		
2008	The Family That Preys	Alice Pratt		
2008	Road to Ingwavuma	Narrator	Documentary film	
2008	AmericanEast	Angela Jensen		
2008	Reach for Me	Evelyn		
2010	Have You Heard From Johannesburg	Narrator	Documentary film	
2013	The Door	E	Short film	
2013	Miracle Rising: South Africa	Narrator	Documentary film	
2013	12 Years a Slave	Mistress Harriet Shaw		
2014	The Hadza: Last of the First	Narrator	Documentary film	
2014	Annabelle	Evelyn		
2015	Mary Lou Williams: The Lady Who Swings the Band	Mary Lou Williams / Narrator	Documentary film	
2015	Mississippi Grind	Sam		
2015	Knucklehead	Sheila		
2016	Captain America: Civil War	Miriam Sharpe		
2016	So B. It	Bernadette		
2017	Burning Sands	Professor Hughes		
2018	Saint Judy	Judge Benton		
2019	Clemency	Warden Bernadine Williams	Also executive producer	
2019	Juanita	Juanita	Also executive producer	
2019	The Lion King	Sarabi	Voice role	
2021	Fatherhood	Marian		
2022	The Gray Man	Margaret Cahill		
2022	Space Oddity	Dr. Sue Olsen		
2023	The Book of Clarence	The Virgin Mary		
2024	Summer Camp	Mary		
2024	'Salem's Lot	Dr. Cody		
TBA	Viral	Dr. Johnetta	Post-production	
TBA	2034	TBA	Post-production	
TBA	The Thing That Hurts	TBA	Post-production	

=== Television ===
Year	Title	Role	Notes	Ref.
1978	The Trial of the Moke	Lucy	Television film	
1979	Freedom Road	Katie	Television film	
1980	The White Shadow	Sandra Wilcox	Episode: "Reunion: Part 1"	
1981	The Sophisticated Gents	Evelyn Evers	Miniseries	
1982	For Colored Girls Who Have Considered Suicide/ When the Rainbow Is Enuf	Woman who lost her stuff	American Playhouse production	
1982	The Ambush Murders	Kariha Ellsworth	Television film	
1982–1983	Tucker's Witch	Marcia Fulbright	12 episodes	
1983	Hill Street Blues	Doris Robson	3 episodes	
1984	The Killing Floor	Mattie Custer	American Playhouse production	
1985	Sara	Rozalyn Dupree	13 episodes	
1985	Words by Heart	Claudie Sills	Television film	
1985	Go Tell It on the Mountain	Esther	American Playhouse production	
1985	Faerie Tale Theatre	Princess Lovinia	Episode: "Puss in Boots"	
1985–1988	St. Elsewhere	Dr. Roxanne Turner	16 episodes	
1986	L.A. Law	Adrian Moore	Episode: "Pilot"	
1986	Unnatural Causes	Maude DeVictor	Television film	
1987	Mandela	Winnie Mandela	Television film	
1988	The Child Saver	Andrea Crawford	Television film	
1989	A Mother's Courage: The Mary Thomas Story	Mary Thomas	Television film	
1994	Frasier	Edna	Voice role; Episode: "The Botched Language of Cranes"	
1994	Aliens for Breakfast	Mrs. Marks	Television film	
1994	Race to Freedom: The Underground Railroad	Harriet Tubman	Television film	
1995	The Piano Lesson	Berniece	Television film	
1996	Gulliver's Travels	Queen of Brobdingnag	Miniseries	
1997	Happily Ever After: Fairy Tales for Every Child	Wilnoome Bear	Voice role; Episode: "Goldilocks and the Three Bears"	
1997	The Member of the Wedding	Berenice Sadie Brown	Television film	
1997	Miss Evers' Boys	Eunice Evers	Television film	
1998	Homicide: Life on the Street	Dr. Roxanne Turner	Episode: "Mercy"	
2000	Holiday Heart	Wanda	Television film	
2003	The Practice	Denise Freeman	2 episodes	
2003	Static Shock	Jean Hawkins	Voice role; Episode: "Flashback"	
2003	A Wrinkle in Time	Mrs. Whatsit	Television film	
2005–2006	Desperate Housewives	Betty Applewhite	19 episodes	
2006	The Water Is Wide	Mrs. Brown	Television film	
2007	Pictures of Hollis Woods	Edna Reilly	Television film	
2008	My Own Worst Enemy	Mavis Heller	9 episodes	
2009–2010	Three Rivers	Dr. Sophia Jordan	12 episodes	
2010–2012	True Blood	Ruby Jean Reynolds	5 episodes	
2010	Black Panther	Ramonda, Dondi Reese, Dora Milaje, Miss M'Buye	Voice role; 5 episodes	
2010–2011	Memphis Beat	Lt. Tanya Rice	20 episodes	
2011	Grey's Anatomy	Justine Campbell	Episode: "Heart Shaped Box"	
2012	Private Practice	Dee Bennett	Episode: "The Next Episode"	
2012	Steel Magnolias	Ouiser	Television film	
2013	Copper	Hattie Lemaster	6 episodes	
2014–2015	The Last Ship	Amy Granderson	3 episodes	
2014–2015	State of Affairs	President Constance Payton	Main role; 13 episodes	
2016–2018	Luke Cage	Mariah Stokes Dillard / Black Mariah	Main role; 23 episodes	
2017–2018	A Series of Unfortunate Events	Josephine Anwhistle	3 episodes	
2018	Empire	Renee Holloway	4 episodes	
2019–2021	See	Paris	Main role; 16 episodes (seasons 1-2)	
2020	Make It Work!	Herself	Television special	
2022	The Porter	Fay	Main role; 6 episodes (also executive producer)	
2022	Harriet Tubman: Visions of Freedom	Narrator	Aired on PBS	
2023–2025	Moon Girl and Devil Dinosaur	Miriam "Mimi" Lafayette	Voice role; 40 episodes	
2024	Star Trek: Lower Decks	Alternate Lily Sloane	Voice role; Episodes: "Fissure Quest"	
2025	The Last Frontier	Jacqueline Bradford	Main role; 10 episodes	
2026	The Boroughs	Judy Daniels	Main role; 8 episodes	

=== Theatre ===
Year	Title	Role	Notes	Ref.
1975	Me and Bessie	Woman	Edison Theatre, Broadway	
1981	2 by South	Precious Blood	Theatre at St. Clements, New York	
2001	Kindred	Dana Franklin	Audio Drama	
2004	Drowning Crow	Josephine Ark Trip	Biltmore Theatre, Broadway	

== Bibliography ==
- Fearn-Banks, Kathleen (2005). Historical Dictionary of African-American Television. Historical Dictionaries of Literature and the Arts. Scarecrow Press. pp. 584. ISBN 978-0810853355.
- Mapp, Edward (2008). African Americans and the Oscar: Decades of Struggle and Achievement. Scarecrow Press. p. 218. ISBN 978-0810861060.
- Otfinoski, Steven (2010). African Americans in the Performing Arts. Facts on File. pp. 280. ISBN 978-0816078387.
