= Richard Yearwood =

Canadian actor

- Occupations: Actor; television host; director; producer
- Years active: 1980–present

Richard Yearwood is a British-Canadian actor, television host, director and producer, who is best known for providing the voice of Donkey Kong in Donkey Kong Country.

== Career ==
Yearwood began his acting career in 1980, in the television series The Littlest Hobo as Danny McLean. His other recurring roles include, Special Agent Bush in Due South, Mr. Smith in Once a Thief, Jor in Relic Hunter, Nestov in Tracker and Benjamin N'Udu in InSecurity.

He also acted in several feature and television films, such as Vincent in Unnatural Causes, Wilson Carlisle in X-Rated, Marco in Down in the Delta, Habersham in Enslavement: The True Story of Fanny Kemble, Randy Benson in Bojangles and Lucius in Blizzard.

Yearwood had also provided occasional voice over work in animated television shows and video games, most notably the Nintendo character Donkey Kong in the Canadian animated television series Donkey Kong Country, he also voiced Rick in Dino Crisis, J.T. in Swamp Thing and voiced T-Bear in Blood Brothers.

In video games, he did the sounds for Rick in the Dino coliseum unlockable mini-game, but was uncredited. He also voiced President Hamilton in True Crime: New York City and Stilwater's Resident in Saints Row.

He was also the television host of the reality television series Date with Design and was the co-host of the television series Love by Design.

Outside of acting, Yearwood has also worked as a director and producer. He has directed and produced various television shows such as Restaurant Makeover, Marriage Under Construction, Fashion File Host Hunt, Gods of Accident and Love It or List It.

== Filmography ==
=== Film ===
Year	Title	Role	Notes
1983	Snow	—N/a	Short film
1986	Where's Pete	—N/a	Short film
1986	Unnatural Causes	Vincent	Television film
1993	X-Rated	Wilson Carlisle	Television film
1993	Blood Brothers	T-Bear	
1993	Survive the Night	Skinhead	Television film
1995	No Contest	Young Cop	
1995	Street Law	Michelangelo	
1997	Elvis Meets Nixon	Brother #1	Television film
1998	Blind Faith	Tough Kid Mercer	
1998	Sanctuary	Ritter Wells	
1998	Down in the Delta	Marco	
1999	Freak City	Aise Jefferson	Television film
1999	Dangerous Evidence: The Lori Jackson Story	Cpl. Lindsey Scott	Television film
2000	Enslavement: The True Story of Fanny Kemble	Habersham	Television film
2000	Songs in Ordinary Time	Earlie Jones	Television film
2001	Bojangles	Randy Benson	Television film
2002	Christmas Rush	Kid Blast	Television film
2003	Blizzard	Lucius	Television film
2003	Webs	Ray	Television film
2003	Detention	Leon	
2005	Mayday	Ensign Kyle Eggers	
2009	Battlestar Galactica: The Plan	Marine	Television film
2013	Percy Jackson: Sea of Monsters	Ganymede	
2014	River of Fundament	REN Sales Executive Singer	
2023	DKC: Return to Krocodile Isle	Donkey Kong (voice)	Animated Short Fan Film

=== Television ===
Year	Title	Role	Notes
1980–1984	The Littlest Hobo	Danny McLean / Shawn Turner	Episodes: "License to Steal", "Finders Keepers", "Arrividerci Roma"
1981	Cagney & Lacey	Randy	Episode: "Pilot"
1987	Dinosaucers	Paul (voice)	18 episodes
1988	Chasing Rainbows	Shoeshine Pete	14 episodes
1989	Srating from Scratch	—N/a	Episode: "Robbie and Friends"
1990	T. and T.	Buzz	Episode: "Halfway to Nowhere"
1990–1991	Swamp Thing	J.T. (voice)	TV Mini-series; 5 episodes
1991	Shining Time Station	Customer	Episode: "A Dog's Life"
1991	Hammerman	Additional voices	
1991	Scales of Justice	Sutcliffe Logan	Episode "Regina v Logan"
1994	Kung Fu: The Legend Continues	Joshua	Episode: "Saturday at the Museum with George"
1994	Monster Force	Additional voices	13 episodes
1994–1999	Tales from the Cryptkeeper	Nathan / Dennis the Store Manager (voices)	2 episodes
1995	Ultraforce	Additional voices	Episode: "Prime Time"
1996	Due South	Special Agent Bush	Episode: "The Edge"
1996	Ace Ventura: Pet Detective	Additional voices	
1996	Can I Get a Witness?	—N/a	
1997	The Magic School Bus	Jake's Owner (voice)	Episode: "In the City"
1997–2000	Donkey Kong Country	Donkey Kong (voice)	40 episodes
1998	Once a Thief	Mr. Smith	Episode: "Mama's Boys"
1999	The Outer Limits	Lawrence	Episode: "Small Friends"
2000	The City	Homestyle	
2000	Relic Hunter	Jor	Episode: "Used Hearts"
2000	Twice in a Lifetime	Daddy	Episode: "Used Hearts"
2001	Shotgun Love Dolls	Bosworth Yardley	Television film
2001–2002	Tracker	Nestov	3 episodes
2002	Love by Design	Co-Host	Reality television series
2003	Alen Tracker	Nestove	
2003	Date with Design	Host	Reality television series
2003	Platinum	Shorty Boy	4 episodes
2006–2008	Growing Up Creepie	Budge Bentley (voice)	10 episodes
2010	InSecurity	Benjamin N'Udu	23 episodes

=== Video games ===
Year	Title	Role	Notes
1999	Dino Crisis	Rick	
2005	True Crime: New York City	President Hamilton	
2006	Saints Row	Stilwater's Resident	

== Creative staff ==
- Restaurant Makeover (2006–2007) - Director
- Green Force (2006) - Director
- Marriage Under Construction (2007) - Director, associate producer
- Fashion File Host Hunt (2007) - Director, producer
- Gods of Accident (2010) - Executive producer, producer
- My Generation (2012) - Director
- Shannon & Sophie (2014) - Director
- Love It or List It (2014–2019) - Director
- Rock, Paper, Scissors (2021) - Director, producer
