= Webs (film) =

- DVD cover
- Written by: Grenville Case
- Story by: Grenville Case
- Directed by: David Wu
- Starring: Richard Grieco; Kate Greenhouse; Richard Yearwood; Colin Fox; Jeff Douglas
- Theme music composer: Lawrence Sharagge
- Country of origin: United States
- Original language: English

Production
- Producers: Derek S. Rappaport; Dara Cohen
- Editor: David Wu
- Running time: 84 minutes

Original release
- Network: Sci Fi Channel
- Release: June 28, 2003

Webs is a 2003 science fiction-horror television film directed by David Wu and starring Richard Grieco, Colin Fox and Kate Greenhouse. Produced by the Sci-Fi Channel, it was filmed in Toronto, Ontario, Canada.

== Plot ==
Four electricians, Dean, Junior, Ray and Sheldon (nicknamed "Shelly"), are sent to cut off the power in a condemned building before it is torn down. Upon breaking down a door, they discover an old laboratory, with an atomic pile inside powering a mysterious machine. The group turns on the device, which creates a dimensional portal that Dean falls into. Junior goes in after him, and they wind up outside a deserted and web-covered Chicago. In the lab, Ray and Shelly read a journal left behind by the scientists. Shelly realizes that the researchers were attempting to make a gateway to a parallel universe, and he and Ray decide to enter the portal.

Junior leads Ray and Shelly to a broken-down security van, with a large amount of money in the back. Junior, Ray and Shelly start celebrating, while Dean comes running back armed with a block of wood. Junior is suddenly attacked by a spider person and dies. More spider people descend on Dean, Ray and Shelly, before a group of human survivors kill the creatures. Dean, Ray and Shelly head back to the portal, but Dean stops to help a survivor, and is unable to return in time before the portal closes. At the lab, the atomic pile shorts the portal. Shelly attempts to fix it, while Ray heads away to find help. Later, he returns with a small arsenal of guns.

The survivors bring Dean into their hideout, where they meet Crane. A female survivor, Elayna, insists that Dean come with them to see "The Old Man". At the base, Dean meets Dr. Richard Moreli, who became stranded inside the portal he invented, and has been trapped for 30 years. Dean tells him his friends are on the other side of the portal and trying to fix it. Dr. Moreli reveals that when he opened the portal, it let in evil, giant Spider Queens into this parallel Earth, who set out to enslave and devour most of humankind. Elayna says the "soldiers" used to be normal people, but the Spider Queen's venom makes them completely under her control. The group leaves the base to find the Spider Queen has been watching them. They hear gunshots and find Shelly and Ray. The survivors bring them back to the base, where Shelly and Moreli begin to build a new portal.

The lookouts later spot "soldiers" in the building and go to hunt them down. Dean and Ray stay behind to defend Shelly and Moreli. Dean gets impatient and goes off to help. Dean, Crane and Elayna meet up and go back for Moreli, but find Ray by himself with a broken leg. The three set out for the Queen's lair, while Ray stays behind to build traps. They find Moreli in the food chamber, but discover Shelly has been bitten. Shelly grabs Dean's gun and holds it to his head, telling them to go. The four race back to the base, while Shelly comes face to face with the Queen. Shelly tries to shoot her, but he is too far gone to take the shot. Fully converted by her venom, he leads the Queen and her army back to the base. The "soldiers" kill everyone but Crane, who kills what remains of her army save Shelly and the Queen. Crane collapses, and Moreli leaves the makeshift lab to be with him. Crane dies in Moreli's arms, before the Queen leaps down and kills Moreli.

Shelly enters the lab, turning off the power. Dean tries to get through to him, but fails and is forced to kill him. Dean and Elayna work hurriedly to finish the portal. The Queen shows up as they are about to turn it on. Dean grabs the last two wires, and connects them to the Queen, who gets electrocuted by the current. Dean and Elayna jump through the portal. The strain on the power system causes it and the Queen to explode.

Dean and Elayna wake up on a beach and share a kiss, just before the shadow of a large flying animal descends upon them. The two have evidently not made it back to Dean's original Earth, but to another alternate world.

== Cast ==
- Richard Grieco as Dean
- Kate Greenhouse as Elena
- Colin Fox as Dr. Richard Morelli
- Richard Yearwood as Ray
- Jeffrey Douglas as Sheldon
- David Nerman as Crane

== Release ==
The film was released on DVD by Universal Pictures on June 7, 2004. It was released again by Image on Aug 5, 2008.

== Reception ==
The film has received mixed to negative reviews from critics.

Erich Asperschlager from DVD Verdict gave the film a mostly positive review, criticizing the film's predictable beginning and the improbability of the film's conclusion, but also complimented the film's surprisingly effective special effects, summarizing, "Though Webs feels like a combination of elements from much better movies, the sum of those parts is surprisingly tolerable".
