= Passion Fish =

1992 film by John Sayles

- Theatrical release poster
- Directed by: John Sayles
- Screenplay by: John Sayles
- Produced by: Sarah Green; Maggie Renzi
- Starring: Mary McDonnell; Alfre Woodard; Leo Burmester; Vondie Curtis-Hall; David Strathairn
- Cinematography: Roger Deakins
- Edited by: John Sayles
- Music by: Mason Daring
- Distributed by: Miramax Films (theatrical); Columbia TriStar Home Video (home video)
- Release date: December 9, 1992 (United States)
- Running time: 135 minutes
- Country: United States
- Language: English
- Budget: $5 million
- Box office: $4 million

Passion Fish is a 1992 American drama film written and directed by John Sayles. The film stars Mary McDonnell, Alfre Woodard, Vondie Curtis-Hall, David Strathairn, Leo Burmester, and Angela Bassett. It tells the story of a soap opera star (McDonnell), who after becoming paralyzed from a car crash, is forced by circumstance to return to her family home and rely upon a series of nurses for her basic care. Her anger and alcohol use forces each nurse to leave her employment, until one shows up who guarantees to stay.

Sayles based the screenplay on his experiences working as an orderly in hospitals and nursing homes.

Filming took place in the Acadiana region of Louisiana in May 1992. The film premiered in the United States on December 9, 1992, distributed by Miramax Films. It received widespread critical acclaim for its performances, direction, cinematography, and story. McDonnell received an Academy Award nomination for Best Actress and Woodard won an Independent Spirit Award for Best Supporting Female.

== Plot ==
May-Alice Culhane, a New York actress on a daytime soap opera, lies in a hospital bed, confused and scared because she is unable to sit up. She attempts to press the call button but ends up switching on the TV, which happens to be playing a scene from the soap featuring her.

Culhane has been left paralyzed after an accident on her way to getting her legs waxed. With no other options, she returns to her family's old and empty home in Louisiana, where she drinks hard, is dissatisfied with every caregiver, and wallows in self-pity.

Her outlook begins to change with the arrival of Chantelle, a nurse with her own problems. The two gradually find a heartfelt connection with each other, and as a result, their lives subtly change.

== Cast ==
- Mary McDonnell as May-Alice Culhane
- Alfre Woodard as Chantelle Blades
- Vondie Curtis-Hall as Sugar LeDoux
- David Strathairn as Rennie Boudreaux
- Leo Burmester as Reeves Culhane
- Nora Dunn as Ti-Marie Robichaux
- Michael Mantell as Dr. Kline
- Mary Portser as Precious Robichaux
- Angela Bassett as Dawn/Rhonda
- Sheila Kelley as Kim
- Maggie Renzi as Louise
- Tom Wright as Luther
- John Sayles as Soap Doctor

== Production ==
Director John Sayles said his inspiration for the story came from the film Persona, as well as his own experiences working as a hospital orderly. In recovery for a back injury, Sayles was in the queue for X-rays and observed many of the wheelchair-using patients were women accompanied by their nurses. Sayles said, “A lot of them were really bored with each other and not especially nice to each other. And these are people who spend at least eight hours a day together — sometimes 24 — and they may have nothing in common. So I started thinking about that relationship."

Sayles wrote the role of May-Alice with Mary McDonnell, whom he had previously collaborated with on Matewan, in mind. Filming took place over 34 days in Louisiana, beginning in May 1992.

== Reception ==
=== Critical reception ===
On Rotten Tomatoes, it has an approval rating of 100% based on reviews from 25 critics, with an average rating of 7.9/10.

Critics praised the film for its exploration of relationship dynamics, female friendship, and character detail. Emanuel Levy noted, "Working again in the 'woman’s picture' domain, Sayles showed he could deal with material usually seen in 'TV Movie of the Week' in a mature, non-melodramatic way. Centering on female friendship, Passion Fish coincided with a cycle of studio films about female bonding, such as Thelma and Louise, A League of Their Own, and Fried Green Tomatoes." Levy continued, "On the surface, the heroines play familiar types, but Sayles again shows his forte in etching deft characterizations, detailing the emotional transformation of each woman and the bond they establish once they get to know one another."

Roger Ebert of the Chicago Sun-Times gave Passion Fish four out of four stars and wrote, "There are elements here of a vaguely similar relationship in 'Driving Miss Daisy,' but Sayles has his own film, direct and original, and in the struggle of wills between these two characters he creates two of the most interesting human portraits of the year." Janet Maslin of The New York Times also lauded the film and observed Sayles "refuses to make his characters simple or stupid for the movies."

Praise for the acting was unanimous. Michael Wilmington of the Los Angeles Times wrote, "It’s a critical cliche to talk about Oscar-worthy performances in the flood of year-end candidates, but Woodard and McDonnell deserve a look—from everybody. In the movie, the two show us a developing love and respect that is subterranean, almost unspoken, seeping up beneath a contentious surface. They have the easy, emotion-stretching mastery and limber spontaneity that marks the best screen acting."

Critic Malcolm Johnson of the Hartford Courant also praised the cinematography and setting. He wrote, "as photographed by Roger Deakins, 'Passion Fish' mirrors May-Alice's growing fascination with photographing the reclaimed world of her lost youth, a milieu Mason Daring amplifies with Cajun music. But more than a voyage into the bayous, 'Passion Fish' is a celebration of sisterhood and rebirth, movingly enacted by two of our finest actresses."

In November 2021, the film was featured as part of The Criterion Channel's series "Between Us Girls: Bonds Between Women".

=== Box office ===
Passion Fish received a limited release on December 9, 1992, running for one week, the minimum required to make it eligible for consideration at the next year's Academy Awards. The film earned $36,332 (14,385 of that in the weekend) in the week from showings in two theaters. After receiving Academy Award nominations in February 1993, the film was released to 191 theaters, where it earned over 99% of its gross of $4.8 million.

=== Awards and nominations ===
Award	Category	Nominee	Result	Ref.
Academy Awards	Best Actress	Mary McDonnell	Nominated	
Academy Awards	Best Screenplay – Written Directly for the Screen	John Sayles	Nominated	
Dallas-Fort Worth Film Critics Association Awards	Best Film	Passion Fish	Nominated	
Film Fest Gent	Grand Prix	John Sayles	Won	
Golden Globe Awards	Best Actress in a Motion Picture – Drama	Mary McDonnell	Nominated	
Golden Globe Awards	Best Supporting Actress – Motion Picture	Alfre Woodard	Nominated	
Independent Spirit Awards	Best Supporting Male	David Strathairn	Nominated	
Independent Spirit Awards	Best Supporting Female	Alfre Woodard	Won	
Los Angeles Film Critics Association Awards	Best Actress	Alfre Woodard	Nominated	
NAACP Image Awards	Outstanding Supporting Actress in a Motion Picture	Alfre Woodard	Nominated	
New York Film Critics Circle Awards	Best Supporting Actress	Alfre Woodard	Nominated	
Turkish Film Critics Association Awards	Best Foreign Film	Passion Fish	17th Place	
Writers Guild of America Awards	Best Screenplay – Written Directly for the Screen	John Sayles	Nominated	
