= Unnatural Causes (1986 film) =

Unnatural Causes is an American television film directed by Lamont Johnson and with a teleplay by John Sayles and story by Martin M. Goldstein and Stephen Doran & Robert Jacobs that is based on the true story of Maude DeVictor, a United States Department of Veterans Affairs counselor who worked to expose the government coverup of the dangers of Agent Orange. The film premiered on NBC on November 10, 1986. The film stars Alfre Woodard as Maude DeVictor, John Ritter as Frank Coleman, Patti LaBelle as Jeanette Thompson, John Vargas as Fernando 'Nando' Sanchez, Belinda Lang as Helen Cassady, and Richard Yearwood as Vincent. For their work, Woodard was nominated for the Primetime Emmy Award for Outstanding Lead Actress in a Limited Series or Movie and Johnson was nominated for the Primetime Emmy Award for Outstanding Directing in a Limited Series or Special.

== Plot ==
Frank Coleman is a Vietnam War veteran dying from cancer caused by Agent Orange. Maude DeVictor is Coleman's counselor at the United States Department of Veterans Affairs. The two attempt to expose the government coverup of the dangerous side effects of Agent Orange, meeting many difficult challenges in the process.
