= Down in the Delta =

1998 American drama film by Maya Angelou

- Theatrical release poster
- Directed by: Maya Angelou
- Written by: Myron Goble
- Produced by: Rick Rosenberg; Bob Christiansen; Victor McGauley; Wesley Snipes
- Starring: Alfre Woodard; Al Freeman, Jr. Esther Rolle; Mary Alice; Loretta Devine; Wesley Snipes
- Cinematography: William Wages
- Edited by: Nancy Richardson
- Music by: Stanley Clarke
- Distributed by: Miramax Films
- Release dates: August 5, 1998 (Urbanworld Film Festival); September 17, 1998 (Toronto Film Festival); December 25, 1998 (U.S.)
- Running time: 112 minutes
- Country: United States
- Language: English
- Box office: $5.6 million

Down in the Delta is a 1998 American drama film, directed by Maya Angelou (in her only film directing effort) and starring Alfre Woodard, Al Freeman Jr., Esther Rolle (in her final film released during her lifetime), Loretta Devine, and Wesley Snipes.

== Plot ==
Rosa Lynn Sinclair, an elderly woman, lives in a Chicago housing project with her daughter Loretta and her two grandchildren, four-year-old Tracy (who is autistic) and thirteen-year-old Thomas. Disappointed in Loretta's life choices and afraid of the troubled circumstances surrounding her grandson Thomas, Rosa Lynn decides to send her daughter and grandchildren to visit with her brother-in-law in Mississippi for the summer.

Loretta, a drug addict, declines to go, especially since her uncle Earl lives in the dry and rural part of the Mississippi Delta, and already juggles his business and a wife, Annie, who has Alzheimer's disease and is cared for by a housekeeper.

Before they depart, Rosa Lynn pawns a silver candelabrum, a family heirloom they refer to as "Nathan," the name of their slave ancestor. Exiting the pawn shop, Rosa Lynn throws the pawn ticket into a street side trashcan, hoping that her daughter will value the family relic enough to pick it up and redeem it before the candelabrum becomes the property of the pawn shop. Loretta picks the ticket up out of the trashcan, hoping to redeem Nathan later.

Earl, a wise man of few words, welcomes the trio to his home in rural Mississippi. Earl gives Loretta a job in his restaurant, called Just Chicken, where she initially has trouble handling the work and the demands of a daily schedule. Eventually, the visiting family begin to find strength in their rural roots, and start to rebuild their lives.

Thomas teaches Loretta enough basic arithmetic for her to be able to waitress, and thus make extra money in tips. Loretta becomes friendly with a nice local customer named Carl (Nigel Shawn Williams). Eventually, her daughter Tracy says her first words.

A few troubles ensue, one involving Earl teaching Thomas about guns, and the other when Annie falls and breaks her hip. By the end of the summer, the initially sullen Loretta decides to stay on and make her life in the Delta. In the final scene, Earl reveals that Loretta's great-great-grandfather, a slave named Nathan, was sold away from his wife and children for the sterling silver candelabrum. During the Civil War, Nathan's son Jesse stole the candelabrum, which has since been passed down through generations of their family, along with Nathan's story.

== Cast ==
- Alfre Woodard as Loretta Sinclair
- Al Freeman Jr. as Earl Sinclair
- Esther Rolle as Annie Sinclair
- Mary Alice as Rosa Lynn Sinclair
- Loretta Devine as Zenia
- Wesley Snipes as Will Sinclair
- Anne-Marie Johnson as Monica Sinclair
- Mpho Koaho as Thomas Sinclair
- Justin Lord as Dr. Rainey
- Kulani Hassen as Tracy Sinclair
- Sandra Caldwell as Volunteer
- Colleen Williams as Tourist Woman
- Richard Blackburn as Tourist Man
- Philip Akin as Manager
- Mary Fallick as Drug Addict
- Sandi Ross as Pawnbroker
- Barbara Barnes-Hopkins as Prim Woman
- Richard Yearwood as Marco
- Troy Seivwright-Adams as Collin
- Kevin Duhaney as Justin

== Music ==
The original soundtrack was released by Virgin Records.

1. "Believe in Love" - Sunday (featuring Whitney Houston)
2. "God's Stepchild" - Janet Jackson (credited as Janet)
3. "Heaven Must Be Like This" - D'Angelo
4. "If Ever" - Stevie Wonder
5. "Where Would I Be" - The Leverts (Eddie, Gerald, and Sean)
6. "I'm Only Human" - Luther Vandross (featuring Cassandra Wilson and Bob James)
7. "Just a Little Luv" - Shawn Stockman
8. "We Belong Together" - Tony Thompson And Antoinette
9. "Don't Talk 2 Strangers" - Chaka Khan
10. "Let It Go" - Jazzyfatnastees featuring The Roots
11. "My Soul Don't Dream" - Meshell N'degeocello & Keb' Mo'
12. "Uh Uh Ooh Ooh Look Out Here It Comes" - Ashford & Simpson
13. "Don't Let Nuthin' Keep You Down" - Sounds of Blackness
14. "Family (Score)" - Stanley Clarke
15. "The Rain" - Tracie Spencer
16. "Patchwork Quilt" - Sweet Honey in the Rock

== Reception ==
=== Box office ===
The film was successful on limited release, grossing $2,497,557 on its first week of release.

=== Critical response ===
On review aggregate site Rotten Tomatoes, Down in the Delta has an approval rating of 76% based on 72 critics' reviews. The consensus states: "Although director Maya Angelou is done few favors by a screenplay drawn in broad strokes, Down in the Delta offers some fine performances and a heartfelt message." Metacritic, which uses a weighted average, assigned the film a score of 73 out of 100, based on 23 critics, indicating "generally favorable" reviews.

Alfre Woodard's work drew praise from San Francisco Chronicle reviewer Peter Stack, who lauded her for "a beautifully layered performance...Woodard is magical as a single mother haunted by drugs, alcohol and an inadequate education. She almost single-handedly shores up this somewhat simplistic movie...[h]er instincts for drama and humor provide a welcome dose of human reality, saving a script that veers toward the sentimental."

In Variety, Joe Leydon wrote, "Throughout Down in the Delta, Angelou and Goble emphasize simple truths and intelligent optimism", and that the film "places great stock in the strength of family ties and the soul-enhancing value of returning to roots" without crossing into melodrama.

=== Accolades ===
- Acapulco Black Film Festival
  - Best Film (nominated)
  - Best Director - Maya Angelou (nominated)
  - Best Actress - Alfre Woodard (nominated)
  - Best Soundtrack (nominated)
- Chicago International Film Festival
  - Audience Choice for Best Feature - Maya Angelou (winner)
- Independent Spirit Awards
  - Best Female Lead - Alfre Woodard (nominated)
- NAACP Image Awards
  - Outstanding Lead Actress in a Motion Picture - Alfre Woodard (nominated)
  - Outstanding Motion Picture (nominated)
- Prism Awards
  - Theatrical Feature Film (winner)
- Young Artist Awards
  - Best Performance in a Feature Film - Young Actress Age Ten or Under - Kulani Hassen (nominated)
