= Ismail Merchant =

Indian film producer (1936–2005)

- Born: Ismail Noor Muhammad Abdul Rahman; 25 December 1936; Bombay, India
- Died: 24 May 2005 (aged 68); London, England
- Resting place: Mumbai, India
- Education: University of Bombay; New York University
- Occupations: Film producer, director
- Years active: 1960–2005
- Partner: James Ivory (1961–2005; Merchant's death)

Ismail Merchant (born Ismail Noor Muhammad Abdul Rahman; 25 December 1936 – 24 May 2005) was an Indian film producer. He worked for many years in collaboration with Merchant Ivory Productions which included film director (and Merchant's longtime professional and domestic partner) James Ivory as well as screenwriter Ruth Prawer Jhabvala. Together they made film adaptations from the novels of E.M. Forster and Henry James. Merchant received the BAFTA Award for Best Film for A Room with a View (1985), and Howards End (1992). He received Academy Award nominations for Best Live Action Short Film for The Creation of a Woman (1959) and for Best Picture for A Room with a View (1985), Howards End (1992), and The Remains of the Day (1993).

== Early life and education ==
Born in Bombay (Mumbai), Merchant was son of Hazra (née Memon) and Noor Mohamed Rehman, a Bombay textile dealer. He grew up speaking Gujarati, Urdu and Memoni fluently, and he later picked up Arabic and English while at school. When he was 11, he and his family were caught up in the 1947 partition of India. His father was the President of the Muslim League and refused to move to Pakistan. Merchant later said that he carried memories of "butchery and riots" into adulthood. As a child at the age of nine, Merchant delivered a speech about partition at a political rally in front of a crowd of 10,000.

At age 13, he developed a close friendship with actress Nimmi, who introduced him to studios in Bombay (the center of Hindi film industry). It was she who inspired his ambitious rise to stardom. Merchant studied at St. Xavier's College, Mumbai and received BA degree from University of Bombay. It was here he developed a love for movies. When he was 22, he moved to the US to study at New York University where he received an MBA degree. While in New York, he gave up his family name of Abdul Rehman for Merchant.

He supported himself by working as a messenger for the UN in New York and used this opportunity to persuade Indian delegates to fund his film projects. Of this experience, he said, "I was not intimidated by anyone or anything." Immersed in a new world of art and culture, it was here that Merchant discovered the films of Bengali director Satyajit Ray, as well as those of European artists such as Ingmar Bergman, Vittorio De Sica, and Federico Fellini. In 1961, Merchant made a short film, The Creation of Woman. It was shown at the Cannes Film Festival and received an Academy Award nomination.

== Merchant Ivory Productions ==
Merchant met American movie director James Ivory at a screening in New York of Ivory's documentary The Sword and the Flute in 1959. In May 1961, Merchant and Ivory formed the film production company Merchant Ivory Productions. Merchant and Ivory were long-term life partners. Their professional and romantic partnership lasted 44 years, from 1961 until Merchant's death in 2005. They were both also involved with the American composer Richard Robbins, with whom they collaborated on many films.

The Guinness Book of World Records says theirs was the longest partnership in independent cinema history. Until Merchant's death in 2005, they produced nearly 40 films, including a number of award winners. Novelist Ruth Prawer Jhabvala was the screenwriter for most of their productions.

In 1963, MIP premiered its first production, The Householder, based upon a novel by Jhabvala (who also wrote the screenplay). This feature became the first Indian-made film to be distributed internationally by a major American studio, Columbia Pictures. However, it wasn't until the 1970s that partnership "hit on a successful formula for studied, slow-moving pieces ... Merchant Ivory became known for their attention to tiny period detail and opulence of their sets". Their first success in this style was Jhabvala's adaptation of Henry James's The Europeans.

In addition to producing, Merchant directed a number of films and two TV features. For TV, he directed a short feature entitled Mahatma and the Mad Boy, and a full-length feature, The Courtesans of Bombay, made for Britain's Channel Four.

Merchant made his film directorial debut with 1993's In Custody based on a novel by Anita Desai, and starring Bollywood actor Shashi Kapoor. Filmed in Bhopal, India, it won National Awards from the Government of India for Best Production Design and Special Jury award for lead actor Shashi Kapoor.

His second directing feature, The Proprietor, starred Jeanne Moreau, Sean Young, Jean-Pierre Aumont and Christopher Cazenove and was filmed on location in Paris, France.

Of his partnership with Ivory and Jhabvala, Merchant once commented: "It is a strange marriage we have at Merchant Ivory ... I am an Indian Muslim, Ruth is a German Jew, and Jim is a Protestant American. Someone once described us as a three-headed god. Maybe they should have called us a three-headed monster!"

== Cooking and writing ==
Merchant was fond of cooking, and he wrote several books including Ismail Merchant's Indian Cuisine, Ismail Merchant's Florence, Ismail Merchant's Passionate Meals, and Ismail Merchant's Paris: Filming and Feasting in France. He also wrote books on filmmaking, including a book about the making of the film The Deceivers in 1988 titled Hullabaloo in Old Jeypur, and another about the making of The Proprietor called Once Upon a Time ... The Proprietor. His last book was entitled My Passage from India: A Filmmaker's Journey from Bombay to Hollywood and Beyond.

== Death ==
Merchant died in Westminster, England aged 68, following surgery for abdominal ulcers. He was buried in Bada Qabrastan Mumbai in Marine Lines, Mumbai, India on 28 May 2005, in keeping with his wish to be buried with his ancestors.

== Filmography ==
=== Producer ===
Year	Title	Notes
1960	The Creation of Woman	Short
1963	The Householder	
1965	Shakespeare Wallah	
1969	The Guru	
1970	Bombay Talkie	
1972	Adventures of a Brown Man in Search of Civilization	Television
1973	Helen: Queen of the Nautch Girls	Short
1973	Savages	
1974	Mahatma and the Mad Boy	Short, also director
1975	The Wild Party	
1975	Autobiography of a Princess	
1976	Sweet Sounds	Short
1977	Roseland	
1976	Hullabaloo Over Georgie and Bonnie's Pictures	
1979	The Europeans	
1980	Jane Austen in Manhattan	
1981	Quartet	
1983	Heat and Dust	
1983	The Courtesans of Bombay	also director
1984	The Bostonians	
1985	A Room with a View	
1985	Noon Wine	Television Film, PBS executive producer (not Merchant Ivory)
1986	My Little Girl	executive producer
1987	Maurice	
1988	The Perfect Murder	executive producer
1988	The Deceivers	
1989	Slaves of New York	
1990	Mr. & Mrs. Bridge	
1990	The Ballad of the Sad Café	
1991	Street Musicians of Bombay	executive producer
1992	Howards End	
1993	The Remains of the Day	
1995	Jefferson in Paris	
1995	Feast of July	executive producer
1996	Surviving Picasso	
1998	A Soldier's Daughter Never Cries	
1998	Side Streets	executive producer
2000	Cotton Mary	
2001	The Golden Bowl	
2002	Merci Docteur Rey	
2003	Le Divorce	
2004	Heights	
2005	The White Countess	Released posthumously

=== Director ===
Year	Title	Notes
1974	Mahatma and the Mad Boy	short
1983	The Courtesans of Bombay	docudrama
1993	In Custody	feature debut
1995	Lumière and Company	segment: Merchant Ivory, Paris; Co-director with James Ivory
1996	The Proprietor	
1999	Cotton Mary	
2001	The Mystic Masseur	

=== Actor ===
Year	Title	Role	Notes
1963	The Householder	Minor Role	uncredited
1965	Shakespeare Wallah	Theater Owner	uncredited
1969	The Guru	Master of Ceremonies	
1970	Bombay Talkie	Fate Machine Producer	
1989	Slaves of New York	Party Guest	uncredited
1995	Jefferson in Paris	Tipoo Sultan's Ambassador	
2023	Merchant Ivory	Himself	

== Awards and nominations ==
In 2002 he was awarded the Padma Bhushan, the third-highest civilian award in the Republic of India. He was also a recipient of The International Center in New York's Award of Excellence.

Year	Association	Category	Film	Result	Ref.
1960	Academy Awards	Best Live Action Short Film	The Creation of a Woman	Nominated	
1985	Academy Awards	Best Picture	A Room with a View	Nominated	
1992	Academy Awards	Best Picture	Howards End	Nominated	
1993	Academy Awards	Best Picture	The Remains of the Day	Nominated	
1983	British Academy Film Awards	Best Film	Heat and Dust	Nominated	
1985	British Academy Film Awards	Best Film	A Room with a View	Won	
1992	British Academy Film Awards	Best Film	Howards End	Won	
1993	British Academy Film Awards	Best Film	The Remains of the Day	Nominated	
1985	Golden Globe Awards	Best Motion Picture – Drama	A Room with a View	Nominated	
1992	Golden Globe Awards	Best Motion Picture – Drama	Howards End	Nominated	
1993	Golden Globe Awards	Best Motion Picture – Drama	The Remains of the Day	Nominated	
1992	Producers Guild of America Award	Best Theatrical Motion Picture	Howards End	Nominated	
1993	Producers Guild of America Award	Best Theatrical Motion Picture	The Remains of the Day	Nominated	
