= Merchant Ivory (film) =

2023 documentary film directed by Stephen Soucy

- Directed by: Stephen Soucy
- Written by: Stephen Soucy; Jon Hart
- Produced by: Stephen Soucy; Jon Hart
- Starring: James Ivory; Ismail Merchant; Helena Bonham Carter; Emma Thompson; Hugh Grant; Vanessa Redgrave
- Cinematography: E. Matthew Cady; Sefa Karatekin
- Edited by: Jon Hart
- Music by: Ryan Homsey
- Distributed by: Cohen Media Group (United States); Curzon Film (United Kingdom); HanWay Films (International)
- Release date: September 2, 2023 (Telluride Film Festival)
- Running time: 112 minutes
- Country: United States
- Language: English

Merchant Ivory is a 2023 documentary film directed by Stephen Soucy that examines the history of Merchant Ivory Productions, the filmmaking partnership between director James Ivory and producer Ismail Merchant.

== Synopsis ==
The film documents the history of Merchant Ivory Productions, which produced films such as A Room with a View (1985), Howards End (1992), and The Remains of the Day (1993).

Beginning with their very first meeting in 1961, Merchant Ivory covers the partnership between Ismail Merchant, an Indian-born producer, and James Ivory, an American director, through their collaboration on over 40 films. The documentary addresses their focus on literary adaptations and period dramas, as well as challenges like financial constraints and cultural differences. It includes interviews with Ivory, as well as actors such as Helena Bonham Carter, Emma Thompson, Anthony Hopkins, and Vanessa Redgrave, screenwriter Ruth Prawer Jhabvala, and other associates of Merchant Ivory Productions.

The film also explores the romantic and personal relationship between Merchant and Ivory, which was kept private for much of their lives, using archival footage and personal anecdotes to illustrate their dynamic and its influence on their work.

== Production ==
Director Stephen Soucy began developing the documentary in 2019, after completing a five-minute short animated film, Rich Atmosphere: The Music in Merchant Ivory Films, with James Ivory providing the narration for the project.

He conducted interviews with surviving Merchant Ivory collaborators in locations including New York, London, Paris, and Mumbai, with Ivory’s home in Claverack, New York, significantly featured. Archival material was accessed from the James Ivory Collection at the University of Oregon, including behind-the-scenes footage, letters, and photographs.

== Release ==
Merchant Ivory had its world premiere at DOC NYC in November 2023. It was featured with three screenings at the Palm Springs International Film Festival in January 2024, accompanied by a Merchant Ivory retrospective. The documentary was also screened at BFI Flare in London in March 2024, with a significant Merchant Ivory contingent present, including actor Helena Bonham Carter.

It was distributed by Cohen Media Group for a limited theatrical release in North America on 30 August 2024. The film became available for streaming on platforms including MUBI, Amazon Prime Video, Apple TV+, and Curzon Home Cinema. A three-year contract with Turner Classic Movies facilitated significant opening coverage for the documentary.

== Reception ==
=== Critical Response ===
The documentary received attention for its focus on Merchant Ivory’s filmography and partnership. On Rotten Tomatoes, it holds an approval rating of 95% based on 44 reviews. Leonard Maltin wrote, “Not every documentary about filmmaking successfully dives beneath the surface as this one does.” David Rooney of The Hollywood Reporter stated, “Anyone with a fondness for these movies and for tales of what might be described as a gentlemen guerrilla filmmaking operation will find immense pleasure here.” Peter Bradshaw of The Guardian described it as “a handsome, thorough tribute to the remarkable independent production company.” Mark Kermode, writing for the BBC, noted, “I defy anyone to watch this doc and not then want to revisit the Merchant Ivory back catalogue.” The Irish Times commented, “Stephen Soucy’s documentary lifts up the petticoats of the prestigious production house. A rollicking account of a long movie partnership that was flying by the seat of its pants.”

== Accolades ==
Year	Award	Category	Recipient(s)	Result	Ref.
2024	Miami Film Festival	Best Documentary	Stephen Soucy	Nominated	
2025	Dorian Awards	LGBTQ Documentary Of The Year	Stephen Soucy and Jon Hart	Nominated	
