= The Europeans (1979 film) =

1979 film based on the Henry James novel directed by James Ivory

- Theatrical release poster
- Directed by: James Ivory
- Screenplay by: Ruth Prawer Jhabvala
- Based on: The Europeans by Henry James
- Produced by: Ismail Merchant
- Starring: Lee Remick; Robin Ellis; Wesley Addy; Lisa Eichhorn
- Cinematography: Larry Pizer
- Edited by: Humphrey Dixon
- Music by: Richard Robbins(score); Clara Schumann(theme)
- Production company: Merchant Ivory Productions
- Distributed by: Enterprise Pictures
- Release dates: May 1979 (Cannes); July 1979 (UK)
- Running time: 90 minutes
- Country: United Kingdom
- Language: English
- Box office: $1,220,000

The Europeans is a 1979 British Merchant Ivory film, directed by James Ivory, produced by Ismail Merchant, and with a screenplay by Ruth Prawer Jhabvala, based on Henry James's novel The Europeans (1878). It stars Lee Remick, Robin Ellis, Tim Woodward and Lisa Eichhorn. It was the first of Merchant Ivory's triptych of Henry James adaptations. It was followed by The Bostonians in 1984 and The Golden Bowl in 2001.

The plot follows the interaction between two European siblings and their American cousins. Facing hard times in Europe, Eugenia, a baroness by marriage, and her younger, artistic brother arrived for the first time in New England in the 1850s to meet their wealthy maternal uncle and their three cousins, the Wentworths. Their bohemian sophistication and alien ways dazzle some of their puritanical American relations and arouse suspicion in others.

The Europeans was the first of Merchant Ivory's period dramas, the genre for which they became best known. Despite being on a modest budget, it featured lavish costumes and sets.

== Plot ==
The Wentworths are a prosperous family living in an estate in a suburb of Boston in the 1850s. The family consists of the dour father, Mr. Wentworth, and his three adult children: Gertrude, Charlotte, and Clifford. Their quiet existence is shaken by the unexpected arrival of almost forgotten relatives from Europe. The Europeans are Felix Young and his older sister Eugenia Münster who are cultured, witty and broke. Felix is interested in painting while Eugenia, sophisticated and alluring, is a baroness as the morganatic wife of a minor German prince.

On his arrival at the Wentworths' state, Felix first meets Gertrude, the nonconformist Wentworth daughter, who is shirking attendance at church and reading romantic literature instead. After introducing himself, he stays for dinner while she is soon intrigued and enchanted by her cousin. The next day, Eugenia pays them a visit and meets the four Wentworths as well as Robert Acton and his sister Lizzie who are the Wentworths' cousins by another side of their family. Eugenia drops backhanded compliments to the befuddled silence of the modest, straightlaced Wentworths. Robert and his sister are cautious and suspicious of Eugenia’s intentions. After Felix and Eugenia have left, the family debates what to do. Because they are relatives, Mr. Wentworth puts them in a neighboring cottage on his property. Felix installs his art studio there and suggests making a portrait of his uncle. Mr. Wentworth declines, but Felix continues to paint Gertrude. Felix wonders why his American relatives seem so little concerned for the pleasures of life, living by strict standards, seeming not to think of their own individual happiness.

Eugenia sets her eyes on the Wentworths’ wealthy cousin Robert Acton, who is torn between captivation by the baroness and distrust of her European worldliness. Eugenia refers little to her marriage other than telling him she has a paper the husband's family wishes her to sign which would dissolve the marriage. During a ball at the Actons’ house, Eugenia is introduced to Robert's ailing mother whom she manages to charm. At the ball, Clifford has too much to drink. When Mr. Wentworth complains about it to Felix, he suggests that his sister’s influence might help the wayward youngster to improve his behaviour, and indeed, Clifford begins visiting Eugenia. Meanwhile, Felix and Gertrude are falling in love. Gertrude tells him her father wants her to marry the Unitarian minister, Mr. Brand, but she doesn't love him. Felix, noticing that Gertrude's pliable sister, Charlotte, seems attracted to the minister, speaks to Mr. Brand, redirecting Brand’s feelings from Gertrude and to Charlotte. One late evening, Robert Acton, who has been away for a few days (and who is beginning to believe he is in love with Eugenia), goes to visit her. Clifford has been enjoying an intimate and promising evening with Eugenia; she makes him hide in a back room. When Clifford comes unexpectedly out of his hiding place, there is a very awkward moment. Clifford leaves, and Eugenia lies about why the young man was at her home. Later, in talking with Clifford, Mr. Acton realizes she had not told the truth. Eugenia's lies begin to weigh upon his thoughts, and he loses interest as Lizzie outflanks the baroness in her attempt to win her brother.

Meanwhile, Felix tells his sister he wants to marry Gertrude; Eugenia lies to him, claiming Robert Acton asked to marry her and claiming she is not sure she wants to do it. Felix makes a visit to his uncle and asks for Gertrude's hand. Mr. Wentworth is bewildered at first, but his other daughter, Charlotte, speaks in favor of the match, then Gertrude enters and declares she will marry Felix, and finally Mr. Brand comes in to say he would like to marry the young couple. Understanding that her goal of finding a wealthy man in the United States has failed, Eugenia decides to return to Germany. She makes a farewell visit to Mrs. Acton, sees Robert as she is leaving and lies to him by claiming to have sent the annulation papers to Germany. Mr. Acton expresses regret that she has decided to leave and offers his carriage to Eugenia for her use at her departure. Felix will marry Gertrude. Clifford will be paired with Lizzie Acton. Mr. Brand and Charlotte plan to marry, far more suited to one another than Gertrude was to Mr. Brand. The final scene shows all of the paired lovers - Felix and Gertrude, Mr. Brand and Charlotte, Lizzy and Clifford - walking together to various destinations, while Eugenia, having availed herself of Acton's offer of his carriage to take her to the boat, travels alone one way, and Acton, on horseback, rides alone the other way.

== Cast ==
- Lee Remick as Eugenia Münster
- Robin Ellis as Robert Acton
- Wesley Addy as Mr. Wentworth
- Tim Woodward as Felix Young
- Tim Choate as Clifford
- Lisa Eichhorn as Gertrude
- Kristin Griffith as Lizzie Acton
- Nancy New as Charlotte
- Norman Snow as Mr. Brand
- Helen Stenborg as Mrs. Acton
- Gedda Petry as Augustine

== Production ==
=== Background ===
Henry James' third novel, The Europeans, first appeared as a serial in The Atlantic Monthly in 1878. Set 30 years earlier in Boston, the story follows the encounter between a family of established, religious New Englanders and their European relations, whose alien, sophisticated ways dazzle some family members and scandalize others. Written as a light comedy of manners, Henry James contrasted the attitudes of the two camps: the Europeans sophistication and light-heartedness with the puritanical asceticism of their American cousins. It portrayed James's vision of America's trying to maintain its innocence by fending off European influences.

By the late 1960s, a film adaptation of the novel kindled the interest of Merchant Ivory Productions, a film company founded in 1961 by producer Ismail Merchant and director James Ivory. Merchant and Ivory were a couple from 1961 until Merchant's death in 2005. During their time together, they made 25 feature films, with Merchant's producing and Ivory's directing. Of these films, 19 were written by their close friend, the novelist Ruth Prawer Jhabvala. After early, modest successes with films such as The Householder, Shakespeare Wallah, and Bombay Talkie, Merchant and Ivory suffered a lean period during the 1970s. Films such as Jane Austen in Manhattan and The Wild Party failed to find an audience. Their fortunes revived dramatically in 1979, however, when they took on adapting Henry James's novel. The Europeans was the first of Merchant Ivory's period dramas, the genre for which they became best known.

The idea behind the project began in 1968 when Jhabvala, a long-time admirer of Henry James, gave the novel to read to James Ivory. The latter had watched BBC television productions of Henry James, thought that he could do much better, and became interested in adapting The Europeans as it could be done with a modest budget using houses of the period, natural locations, and a small cast with few extras.

By 1974, Jhabvala had completed a screenplay, but production was delayed for years as financing proved to be difficult to obtain.

=== Writing ===
Ruth Prawer Jhabvala wrote a faithful screenplay, lifting most of the dialogue from the novel. The novel is a succession of small scenes that do not build to anything particular. She added a scene of a ball at the Acton house, giving the story a pivotal point. The meeting of Eugenia and Mrs. Acton, an isolated incident in the book, is at the center of the ball scene. Ivory liked to have a big party in his film as a focal point when Eugenia begins to recognize that she is out of place there, both with the demure old women who sit in a room to the side and with the young couples on the dance floor. Jhabvala also provided a new ending in which, as Eugenia prepares to leave in a carriage that Acton puts at her disposal, Mr. Brand and Charlotte joyfully speak lines from a book of sermons.

=== Filming ===
Robin Ellis on set by the Barrett House with a handler

Production took place between October and November 1978 on locations using interiors of the period in Barrett House and Bullard-Barr House, both in New Ipswich, New Hampshire; Gardner-Pingree House and Salem Maritime National Historic Site, both located in Salem, Massachusetts; the Lyman Estate in Waltham, Massachusetts; and in Concord, Massachusetts.

The film is notable for its atmosphere of New England countryside in autumn with striking reds and oranges, capturing Henry James' sense of ambivalent wonder at the New World in New England.

== Reception ==
The Europeans was a modest success at the box office in England. It opened at the Curzon in London the same week as Moonraker. It grossed an opening record for the cinema of £11,758 in its first week and was fifth at the London box office. It became Merchant Ivory Productions’ most widely seen film up to that point. The film also performed well on its release at the Paris Theater in New York City, grossing $108,630 in its first three weeks.

The film received a number of lukewarm reviews as a somewhat over-literary adaptation. Critic Chris Elliot noted the movie's "opaque refinements and elusive intentions, a predilection for intricacies of language and manners." Roger Ebert similarly demurred that the movie's "elegantly composed visuals, the stately progression of scenes, the deliberate understatement of the dialogue, are all as ‘faithful’ to James as a film can be. But that's exactly the film's problem: Ivory hasn't found a way to make his own film, and has ended up with a classroom version of James, a film with no juice or life of its own."

Writing for The New York Times, Vincent Canby unfavorably compared the film to the novel: "The beauty and precision of James's prose is that it persuades us his characters are as alive today as they were in 1878. There's nothing quaint or picturesque or foolish about them. They are battlers. This is the feeling that's missing from the otherwise remarkably intelligent, careful screen version of The Europeans that has been adapted with skill by Ruth Prawer Jhabvala and directed with affection by James Ivory."

John Pym, reviewing the film, wrote "For all its engaging sidelong playfulness, the beauty of its settings, and some excellent performances, there is in Ivory's Europeans also a sense of genuine characters trapped somewhat awkwardly by the conventions of their lines."

=== Awards and nominations ===
The Europeans received many nominations but no wins. It was nominated for the Palme d'Or at the 1979 Cannes Film Festival; for Best Costume Design (Judy Moorcroft) at the 1980 Academy Awards; for Best Foreign Film at the 1980 Golden Globes Awards; and for Best Costume Design, Best Production Design and Best Supporting Actress at the 1980 BAFTA Awards.

== Home media ==
In 2003, a special edition DVD of the film was released as part of The Criterion Collection. The special features include an on-camera interview with the Merchant-Ivory team: Ismail Merchant, James Ivory, Ruth Prawer Jhabvala and composer Richard Robbins.

The DVD also includes Sweet Sounds (1976), a 29-minute documentary film directed by The Europeans' composer Richard Robbins. It follows a handful of children chosen for a music development class as they are instructed by their music teachers at NewYork's Mannes College of Music Preparatory School in New York City, of which Richard Robbins was then director.

== Sources ==
- Long, Robert Emmet. The Films of Merchant Ivory. Citadel Press. 1993, ISBN 0-8065-1470-1
- Long, Robert Emmet. James Ivory in Conversation. University of California Press, 2005, ISBN 0-520-23415-4.
- Pym, John. The Wandering Company: Twenty-one years of Merchant Ivory Films. BFI Publishing. 1983 ISBN 0-85170-127-2.
