= Richard Robbins (composer) =

American musical artist (1940–2012)

- Born: Richard Stephen Robbins; December 4, 1940; South Weymouth, Massachusetts
- Died: November 7, 2012 (aged 71) Rhinebeck, New York
- Genres: Film score
- Occupation: Composer

Richard Stephen Robbins (December 4, 1940 – November 7, 2012) was an American composer, and producer of motion picture scores for the Merchant Ivory films.

== Biography ==
Born in Weymouth, Massachusetts in 1940, Robbins started playing the piano at the age of five. As he grew older, he became inspired by the compositions of Philip Glass. After graduating from the New England Conservatory in Boston, Massachusetts, Robbins received a fellowship through a fund established by the philanthropist Frank Huntington Beebe to continue his musical studies in Vienna.

After returning to the United States, Robbins became director of the Mannes School of Music in New York City. In 1976, while still teaching, Robbins became acquainted with Ismail Merchant, the co-founder of the film company Merchant Ivory Productions. Merchant made a half-hour documentary called "Sweet Sounds" - which centered around Mannes School - and Robbins served as the documentary's director and writer. Three years later, in 1979, he wrote the music for Merchant Ivory's film The Europeans; from that point onward, Robbins became Merchant Ivory's music director, composing the scores for nearly all of their work.

== Personal life and death ==
Robbins was gay, and had a relationship with Ismail Merchant, and probably James Ivory, with whom he worked on several films. Robbins lived his later years with his long-term partner, artist Michael Schell. Schell and Robbins worked together on a stage play called "Via Crucis", written about the Stations of the Cross.

On November 7, 2012, Robbins died at his home in Rhinebeck, New York, after suffering from Parkinson's disease. He was 71 years old.

== Awards ==
Robbins was nominated for an Oscar in 1992 for his score for the film Howards End (performed by Martin Jones) and in 1993 for The Remains of the Day. Additionally, he won a Sammy Film Music Award in 1992 for Howards End. He won the Golden Osella for Maurice (1987).

== Filmography ==
Robbins wrote the score for the following films unless otherwise noted:

- Sweet Sounds (1976); short film; director only
- Roseland (1977); assistant to producer Ismail Merchant
- The Europeans (1979)
- Jane Austen in Manhattan (1980)
- Quartet (1981)
- Heat and Dust (1983)
- The Bostonians (1984)
- A Room with a View (1985)
- Sweet Lorraine (1987)
- My Little Girl (1987)
- Maurice (1987)
- The Perfect Murder (1988)
- Slaves of New York (1989)
- Love and Other Sorrows (1989, TV)
- Bail Jumper (1990)
- Mr. & Mrs. Bridge (1990)
- The Ballad of the Sad Café (1991); directed by Simon Callow
- Howards End (1992)
- The Remains of the Day (1993)
- Street Musicians of Bombay (1994); also director
- Jefferson in Paris (1995)
- Surviving Picasso (1996)
- The Proprietor (1996)
- Lumière and Company: segment "Merchant Ivory" (1996)
- The Hidden Dimension (1997)
- A Soldier's Daughter Never Cries (1998)
- Place Vendôme (1998); directed by Nicole Garcia
- Cotton Mary (1999); directed by Ismail Merchant
- The Golden Bowl (2000)
- The Girl (2000), directed by Sande Zeig
- The Mystic Masseur (2001)
- Le Divorce (2003)
- The White Countess (2005); directed by James Ivory
