= The Golden Bowl (film) =

2000 drama film directed by James Ivory

- Original poster
- Directed by: James Ivory
- Screenplay by: Ruth Prawer Jhabvala
- Based on: The Golden Bowl by Henry James
- Produced by: Ismail Merchant
- Starring: Kate Beckinsale; James Fox; Anjelica Huston; Nick Nolte; Jeremy Northam; Madeleine Potter; Uma Thurman
- Cinematography: Tony Pierce-Roberts
- Edited by: John David Allen
- Music by: Richard Robbins
- Production companies: Merchant Ivory Productions; TF1 International
- Distributed by: TF1 International (France); Lions Gate Films (United States); Miramax International (through Buena Vista International; United Kingdom)
- Release dates: 13 September 2000 (France); 3 November 2000 (United Kingdom); 27 April 2001 (United States)
- Running time: 130 minutes
- Countries: United States; United Kingdom; France
- Language: English
- Budget: $15 million
- Box office: $5.7 million

The Golden Bowl is a 2000 period romantic drama film directed by James Ivory. The screenplay by Ruth Prawer Jhabvala is based on the 1904 novel of the same name by Henry James, who considered the work his masterpiece. It stars Kate Beckinsale, James Fox, Anjelica Huston, Nick Nolte, Jeremy Northam, Madeleine Potter, and Uma Thurman.

== Plot ==
Impoverished Roman Prince Amerigo is engaged to American socialite Maggie Verver. Maggie has a very close relationship with her widowed father Adam, a millionaire tycoon living in England who plans a museum in the United States to house his collection of art and antiquities.

Unbeknownst to his fiancée and prior to their engagement, Amerigo had a brief, passionate affair with Maggie's friend Charlotte. Both were penniless, and did not consider marriage. Amerigo breaks off their affair when he becomes engaged.

Charlotte is still in love with him when she visits mutual friend Fanny Assingham in London, where she encounters Maggie. Maggie invites her to the wedding.

At Maggie's request, Amerigo takes Charlotte to an antiques shop to help him look for a wedding gift. The proprietor Jarvis shows them a bowl, carved from a single piece of rock crystal, which he asserts is flawless. Amerigo notices a crack. Charlotte claims not to see the crack, only the bowl's beauty. She is unsure whether to buy the bowl so Jarvis reserves it pending her decision.

Maggie and Amerigo marry and have a son. Adam and Charlotte also marry, much to Maggie's delight. Three years pass and the two couples' lives are closely interwoven. Maggie and Adam's closeness alienates their spouses.

Fanny correctly suspects that Amerigo and Charlotte have rekindled their affair. Maggie also becomes suspicious and confides in Fanny, but Fanny, wanting to protect Maggie's feelings, tries to discourage such thoughts. Adam observes close interactions between Charlotte and Amerigo but stays silent, not wanting Maggie to be hurt.

Maggie looks for a birthday gift for her father in Jarvis's shop, and chooses the bowl Jarvis had set aside for Charlotte years ago. Jarvis delivers it to her home. While there, he recognizes photographs of Amerigo and Charlotte and innocently reveals they were the couple who originally considered purchasing the bowl before the wedding. Maggie realizes that the two were not meeting for the first time, as she had always assumed, and vents her feelings to Fanny. Fanny breaks the glass bowl, saying it is the only proof of Amerigo and Charlotte being together, and she can pretend nothing happened.

Maggie confronts Amerigo, who confesses. Maggie says the bowl represents their marriage, it appeared beautiful and perfect but was flawed. Amerigo begs Maggie not tell her father and not to leave. Maggie agrees not to tell her father for fear of hurting him, but is unsure how she feels about her husband.

Adam is distant, and suggests to Charlotte that they return to the United States for the opening of his museum. She is strongly opposed. Tension grows when Amerigo and Maggie arrive with the Assinghams. Amerigo is distant to Charlotte, who worries that Adam and Maggie know of the affair. Maggie and Adam agree to move apart from each other to protect their families. Maggie and Amerigo prepare for a permanent move to Italy, while Adam puts Charlotte in charge of packing the artifacts in preparation for their move to America. Charlotte begs Amerigo to run away with her but he rejects the idea and expresses guilt at being unfaithful and lying to his wife. Charlotte reconciles to being with Adam, and the film ends with the couple arriving to fanfare in an American city.

== Cast ==
- Uma Thurman as Charlotte Stant
- Jeremy Northam as Prince Amerigo
- Kate Beckinsale as Maggie Verver
- James Fox as Colonel Bob Assingham
- Nick Nolte as Adam Verver
- Anjelica Huston as Fanny Assingham
- Madeleine Potter as Lady Gladys Castledean
- Nicholas Day as Lord Castledean
- Peter Eyre as A. R. Jarvis

== Production ==
Director Ivory, producer Merchant, and screenwriter Jhabvala previously collaborated on screen adaptations of the Henry James novels The Europeans and The Bostonians. Conflict erupted between Northam and Beckinsale after the latter asked him to walk faster in a scene to avoid stepping on the train of her dress. Northam was so angry at being given a "note" by a fellow actor that he became belligerent towards Beckinsale; her partner, Michael Sheen, responded by punching him in the face.

The film was shot at various locations throughout England, including Belvoir Castle in Leicestershire, Burghley House in Lincolnshire, Helmingham Hall in Suffolk, the Kew Bridge Steam Museum and Syon House in Middlesex, and Lancaster House and Mansion House in London. Italian locations included Palazzo Borghese in Artena and Prince Massimo's Castle in Arsoli.

The soundtrack includes "Moonstruck" by Lionel Monckton and Ivan Caryll, "Sarabande" by Claude Debussy, and "Wall Street Rag" by Scott Joplin.

== Release ==
The film premiered at the 2000 Cannes Film Festival. When it received a cool reception, executives at Miramax Films, the original distributor, asked Ivory and Merchant to make several cuts to shorten its running time. When they refused, the company sold the film to Lions Gate.

The film opened throughout Europe before going into limited release in the US on 27 April 2001, following an earlier showing at the Palm Springs International Film Festival. It opened on five screens and earned $90,170 on its opening weekend. At its widest release in the US, it played in 117 theaters. It eventually grossed $3,050,532 in the US and $2,703,146 in foreign markets for a total worldwide box office of $5,753,678.

== Critical reception ==
The Golden Bowl received mixed to positive reviews. On the review aggregator website Rotten Tomatoes, 54% of 87 critics' reviews are positive, with an average rating of 5.4/10. The website's consensus reads: "Coming from the Merchant-Ivory team, The Golden Bowl is visually stunning, but the filmmakers have difficulty in transporting the characterizations of the Henry James novel to the screen."

The New York Times observed, "In translating the novel into a film, the producer Ismail Merchant, his directing partner, James Ivory, and their favorite screenwriter, Ruth Prawer Jhabvala, have made a movie that's an ambitious, profoundly ambiguous statement about their own passion for the cultivated, high-culture sensibility epitomized by James and E. M. Forster, as opposed to the cruder mass culture that has eclipsed these literary heroes . . . Much of the dialogue in Ms. Jhabvala's carefully wrought screenplay voices feelings that remain unspoken in the novel, and this is the movie's biggest problem. No matter how well the characters' thoughts have been translated into speech, the act of compressing their rich, complex inner lives into dialogue without resorting to voice-over narration inevitably tends to cheapen them and turn a drama about the revelation of hidden truths into the terser, more commonplace language of an intelligent soap opera."

Roger Ebert of the Chicago Sun-Times observed, "I admired this movie. It kept me at arm's length, but that is where I am supposed to be; the characters are after all at arm's length from each other, and the tragedy of the story is implied but never spoken aloud. It will help, I think, to be familiar with the novel, or to make a leap of sympathy with the characters."

Mike Clark of USA Today rated the film two out of four stars and commented, "Too many dialogue exchanges sound like actors reading lines, and even the film's better performers seem to be acting in a vacuum. The movie establishes good will (or even great will) in the initial scenes because it's so gorgeous, but the rest is such a slog that even the revealed significance of the title artifact elicits a shrug."

Emanuel Levy of Variety called the film "vastly uneven, with some wonderful period touches but also more than a few tedious moments," "tasteful, diffident and decorous," and "a deliberately paced literary film that takes too long to build narrative momentum and explore its central dramatic conflicts." He added, "James' deft portrait of human frailty and his experimentation in narrative mode only intermittently find vivid expression in the work of Ivory and screenwriter Prawer Jhabvala. Everything in the film, particularly in the last reel, is spelled out in an explicit, literal manner . . . Production values, particularly Andrew Sanders' design and John Bright's costumes, are exquisite, but they decorate a film that's too slow and only sporadically involving."

== Awards and nominations ==
James Ivory was nominated for the Palme d'Or at the 2000 Cannes Film Festival. Production designer Andrew Sanders won the Evening Standard British Film Award for Best Technical/Artistic Achievement.

== Home media ==
The Region 1 DVD was released on 6 November 2001. The film is in anamorphic widescreen format, with audio tracks in English and French, and subtitles in English and Spanish. The only bonus feature is the original theatrical trailer.
