= Madeleine Potter =

American actress

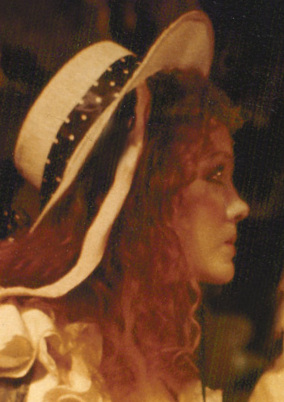
- Madeleine Potter in Loves Labor's Lost, 1981.
- Born: Madeleine Daly Potter; Washington, D.C., U.S.
- Occupation: Actor
- Years active: 1981–present
- Spouse: Patrick Fitzgerald (divorced)

Madeleine Daly Potter is an American actress who has played roles in over 20 films and TV shows, including four productions directed by James Ivory. She has also appeared in numerous stage productions in the United States and United Kingdom. She made her New York stage debut in Loves Labor's Lost at The Shakespeare Center, produced by the Riverside Shakespeare Company in 1981.

== Family ==
Potter is the only daughter of Philip B.K. Potter (1927-1975), an American diplomat who served in the OSS, and his wife, the former Madeleine Mulqueen Daly (1921-1985). She is a niece of Medal of Honor recipient Michael J. Daly and a great-great-granddaughter of New York Mayor Thomas Francis Gilroy. She is also a great-great-granddaughter of Episcopal bishop Alonzo Potter and a great-grand-niece of Episcopal bishop Henry Codman Potter.

== Personal life ==
She was married to Patrick Fitzgerald, an Irish-born American actor, whom she wed in 1990.

Potter's only child, Madeleine Daly (born June 4, 1995), appeared as her character's niece in the 2005 movie The White Countess.

== Filmography ==
=== Film ===
Madeleine Potter film credits
Year	Title	Role	Notes
1984	The Bostonians	Verena Tarrant	
1987	Hello Again	Felicity Glick	
1988	The Suicide Club	Nancy	
1989	Bloodhounds of Broadway	Widow Mary	
1989	Slaves of New York	Daria	
1990	Two Evil Eyes	Annabel	Segment "The Black Cat"
1995	Leapin' Leprechauns!	Morgan de la Fey / Nula	Uncredited
1996	Spellbreaker: Secret of the Leprechauns	Morgan de la Fey / Nula	
2000	The Golden Bowl	Lady Castledean	Merchant Ivory
2002	Refuge	Sylvia Oakes	
2005	The White Countess	Greshenka	
2012	Red Lights	Sarah Sidgwick	

=== Television ===
Madeleine Potter television credits
Year	Title	Role	Notes				
1983	Svengali	Antonia	TV movie				
1986	The Equalizer	Zena	Episode: "Nightscape"				
1988	The Equalizer	Simone Peters / Susan Petersborough	Episode: "A Dance on the Dark Side"				
2002	State of Play	Professor Tate	2 episodes				
2006	Midsomer Murders	Celia Patchett	Episode: "Country Matters"				
2013	Holby City	Sharon Kozinsky	1 episode				
2015	Foyle's War	Edith Del Mar	Episode" "High Castle"				
2015	“[(Mr. Selfridge)]”	Elizabeth Arden	Season IV Episode 2	2023	Unforgotten	Niamh	1 episode

== Audio ==
- Doctor Who - Assassin in the Limelight (2008) - Lizzie Williams
- Doctor Who - The Cradle of the Snake (2010) - Yoanna Rayluss

== Stage ==
=== London ===
- An Ideal Husband, directed by Peter Hall (1996) at Haymarket Theatre
- All My Sons, directed by Howard Davies (1999) on the Lyttelton stage of the Royal National Theatre
- Southwark Fair, directed by Nicholas Hytner (2006) on the Cottsloe stage at the Royal National Theatre
- After Mrs. Rochester, written and directed by Polly Teale (2003) at the Lyric Theatre and then the Duke of York's
- Broken Glass, directed by Iqbal Khan (2010) at the Tricycle Theatre

=== Broadway ===
- Ibsen's Ghosts (1982) as Regina Engstrand, Mrs. Alving's maid
- Coastal Disturbances (1987) as Holly Dancer
- Metamorphosis (1989) as Greta, Gregor Samsa's sister
- The Crucible (1991) as Abigail Williams
- Getting Married (1991) as Leo
- The Master Builder (1992) as Hilde Wangel
- A Little Hotel on the Side (1992) as Victoire
