= Robin Ellis =

British actor and writer (born 1942)

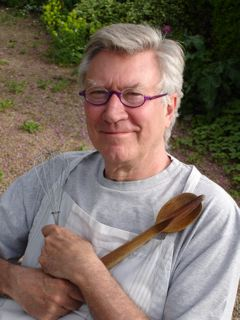
- Born: Anthony Robin Ellis; 8 January 1942 (age 84); Ipswich, Suffolk, England
- Occupation: Actor
- Spouse: Meredith Wheeler (m. 1990)
- Family: Jack Ellis (brother); Peter Ellis (brother)

Anthony Robin Ellis (born 8 January 1942) is a British actor and cookery book writer best known for his role as Captain Ross Poldark in the BBC series Poldark (1975-1977). Other credits include Sense and Sensibility (1971), Elizabeth R (1971), Bel Ami (1971), The Moonstone (1972), A Touch of Class (Fawlty Towers) (1975), She Loves Me (1979), The Europeans (1979), The Curse of King Tut's Tomb (1980), The Good Soldier (1981), Cluedo (British game show) (1990), The Casebook of Sherlock Holmes (1991), The Trial of Lord Lucan (1994), Heartbeat (2001 & 2006), and Poldark (Reboot 2015) (2015–17, and 2019).

== Life and career ==
Ellis was born 8 January 1942, in Ipswich, Suffolk. He was educated at the independent Highgate School in Highgate in north London, and at Fitzwilliam College, Cambridge where he read history and appeared in over 20 plays. His first West End performance was as Captain Jack Absolute in Sheridan's The Rivals at the Haymarket Theatre from 6th October 1966 – August 1967. He went on to play in The Real Inspector Hound at the Criterion Theatre (1968), and Widowers' Houses at the Royal Court Theatre (1970).

He was part of the innovative Actors' Company, founded in 1972 by Ian McKellen and Edward Petherbridge, organised and run democratically by the actors themselves. In that repertory company he played Grimaldi in 'Tis Pity She's a Whore (1972), He played Fainhall in The Way of the World (1973-1974), Theodore in The Wood Demon (1973-1974), and Albany in King Lear (1974).

His big break came in 1975, with his first major role playing heart throb Ross Poldark in the 18th Century classic BBC 1 series, Poldark (1975-1977), adapted from a series of books by the British author Winston Graham.

In 1969, he played Ames in the film Arthur? Arthur!. Ellis co-starred with Lee Remick in the Merchant Ivory film The Europeans (1979), based on the novel by Henry James, playing the role of John Acton. Ellis appeared in the CBS mini-series The Curse of King Tut's Tomb (1980), (playing Howard Carter, the Englishman who discovered the tomb of King Tut), in the ITV drama Heartbeat (2001 & 2006), and in a BBC adaptation of A Dark-Adapted Eye (1994) a psychological thriller written by Ruth Rendell.

Ellis also had a long career in the theatre, including a stint with the Royal Shakespeare Company. He appeared there in a musical version of The Comedy of Errors playing Pinch; in King Lear playing Edmund; Troilus and Cressida playing Achilles; and in Much Ado About Nothing playing Don Pedro. His last West End theatre performance was with Zoë Wanamaker in Sylvia by A.R. Gurney at the Apollo Theatre in 1996.

He had a recurring role in the 2015-2019 BBC adaptation of Poldark as Reverend Halse.

== Health ==
He was diagnosed with Type 2 diabetes.

== Cookery book writer ==
His first cookery book, Delicious Dishes for Diabetics: A Mediterranean Way of Eating, was published in 2011. The US edition was titled Delicious Dishes for Diabetics: Eating Well with Type 2 Diabetes.

== Personal life ==
Ellis lives with his wife Meredith in southwest France. His younger brothers are the actor Jack Ellis and the director Peter Ellis, who died in 2006.
