= Merchant Ivory Productions =

Film production company

- Founded: 1961
- Founder: Ismail Merchant; James Ivory

Merchant Ivory Productions is a film company founded in 1961 by producer Ismail Merchant (1936–2005) and director James Ivory (b. 1928). Merchant and Ivory were life and business partners from 1961 until Merchant's death in 2005. During their time together, they made 44 films. The films were for the most part produced by Merchant and directed by Ivory, and 23 of them were scripted by Ruth Prawer Jhabvala (1927–2013) in some capacity. The films were often based upon novels or short stories, particularly the work of Henry James, E. M. Forster, and Jhabvala herself.

The initial goal of the company was "to make English-language films in India aimed at the international market". The style of Merchant Ivory films set and photographed in India became iconic. The company also went on to make films in the United Kingdom and America.

Some actors and producers associated with Merchant Ivory include Maggie Smith, Leela Naidu, Madhur Jaffrey, Aparna Sen, Shashi Kapoor, Jennifer Kendal, Hugh Grant, James Wilby, Rupert Graves, Simon Callow, Anthony Hopkins, Glenn Close, Uma Thurman, Emma Thompson, Vanessa Redgrave, Natasha Richardson, Ralph Fiennes, Colin Firth, Richard Hawley and Helena Bonham Carter.

Of this collaboration, Merchant once commented: "It is a strange marriage we have at Merchant Ivory... I am an Indian Muslim, Ruth is a German Jew, and Jim is a Protestant American. Someone once described us as a three-headed god. Maybe they should have called us a three-headed monster!"

The expression "Merchant–Ivory film" has made its way into common parlance, to denote a particular genre of film rather than the actual production company. While 1965's Shakespeare Wallah put this genre on the international map, its heyday was the 1980s and 1990s with such films as A Room with a View (1985) and Howards End (1992). A typical "Merchant–Ivory film" would be a period piece, based on a classic novel, set in the early 20th century, usually in Edwardian England, featuring lavish sets and top British actors portraying genteel characters who suffer from disillusionment and tragic entanglements. The main theme often surrounded a house, which took on a particular importance in many Merchant Ivory films.

== History ==
Merchant Ivory Productions was founded in 1961 by Ismail Merchant and James Ivory in India to produce English-language films.

After early, modest successes with films such as The Householder, Shakespeare Wallah, and Bombay Talkie, Merchant and Ivory suffered a lean period during the 1970s. Films such as Jane Austen in Manhattan and The Wild Party failed to find an audience. Their fortunes revived dramatically in 1979 when they made an adaptation of Henry James' novel The Europeans. Their film Heat and Dust (1983) was an art-house hit in Europe, particularly in England. However, it was not until their work together on A Room with a View (1985) that they broke out from the art house into broader success.

In 1985, Merchant Ivory Productions was signed by film distributor Cinecom International Films in order to give Cinecom access to the 11 Merchant Ivory productions at that time as Cinecom had to increase its distribution schedule. In 1986, Merchant Ivory and Cinecom began their co-production lineup with the film The Deceivers. In 1987, after 25 years as an independent producer, Merchant Ivory Productions declined offers by Hollywood power brokers and deep-pocketed investors, mesmerized by the success of the triple-Oscar winning A Room with a View, to take the company public.

Around 1990, they moved their productions to England and the United States. Ruth Prawer Jhabvala became their frequent collaborating writer. Major film studios sought them out; Disney signed Merchant Ivory Productions to a three-year distribution deal in 1991.

In October 2015, Cohen Media Group acquired the Merchant Ivory brand and library, 21 films and nine documentaries including worldwide distribution, for restoration and rerelease as a part of the Cohen Film Collection. Ivory would be creative director on the films' restoration, re-release and promotion.

== Documentary ==
Stephen Soucy's 2023 documentary feature film Merchant Ivory covers the pair's long collaboration and their personal relationship.

== Members ==
=== James Ivory ===
Ivory was known for often directing the productions. He received three Academy Award nominations for his work but never won. He received his first Oscar at the age of 89 for his screenplay for Call Me by Your Name, becoming the oldest person to win an Oscar for writing.

Academy Awards

Year	Film	Category	Result
1986	A Room with a View	Best Director	Nominated
1993	Howards End	Best Director	Nominated
1994	The Remains of the Day	Best Director	Nominated
2018	Call Me by Your Name	Best Adapted Screenplay	Won

=== Ismail Merchant ===
Merchant was known for producing the films. Despite four nominations, he never won.

Academy Awards

Year	Film	Category	Result
1960	The Creation of a Woman	Live Action Short Film	Nominated
1986	A Room with a View	Best Picture	Nominated
1993	Howards End	Best Picture	Nominated
1994	The Remains of the Day	Best Picture	Nominated

=== Ruth Prawer Jhabvala ===
Jhabvala was known for adapting the screenplays. She received three nominations, with two wins.

Academy Awards

Year	Film	Category	Result
1986	A Room with a View	Best Adapted Screenplay	Won
1993	Howards End	Best Adapted Screenplay	Won
1994	The Remains of the Day	Best Adapted Screenplay	Nominated

=== Richard Hawley ===
Hawley started in 1987 as Ivory's first assistant director on Slaves of New York. He was involved in every project to some degree thereafter. In 1994, he started co-running the company with Merchant and departed in 2009 after completion of The City of Your Final Destination.

Year	Film	Involvement
1989	Slaves of New York	First assistant director
1995	Jefferson in Paris	First assistant director Unit production manager
1996	The Proprietor	Associate producer
1998	Side Streets	Executive producer
1998	A Soldier's Daughter Never Cries	Executive producer First assistant director Unit production manager (USA)
1999	Cotton Mary	Producer; North American distribution executive
2000	The Golden Bowl	Executive producer
2001	The Mystic Masseur	Producer
2003	Le Divorce	Co-producer
2005	Heights	Producer; Soundtrack producer
2005	The White Countess	Co-producer; Music producer
2009	The City of Your Final Destination	Co-producer; Production manager

== Filmography ==
Year	Title	Director	Producer	Screenwriter	Source Material	Other notes
1963	The Householder	James Ivory	Ismail Merchant	Ruth Prawer Jhabvala	adapted from the novel of the same name by Jhabvala	the first Merchant Ivory adaptation of a novel by Jhabvala
1965	Shakespeare Wallah	James Ivory	Ismail Merchant	Ruth Prawer Jhabvala	original story	
1969	The Guru	James Ivory	Ismail Merchant	Ruth Prawer Jhabvala and James Ivory	original story	
1969	The Night of Counting the Years	Shadi Abdel Salam	Roberto Rossellini	Shadi Abdel Salam	original story	the first Merchant Ivory film without Merchant, Ivory, or Jhabvala
1970	Bombay Talkie	James Ivory	Ismail Merchant	Ruth Prawer Jhabvala	original story	
1972	Savages	James Ivory	Ismail Merchant, Joseph J.M. Saleh (executive), and Anthony Korner (associate)	George W. S. Trow and Michael O'Donoghue	based on an idea by James Ivory	
1975	The Wild Party	James Ivory	Ismail Merchant	Walter Marks	based on the poem by Joseph Moncure March	
1975	Autobiography of a Princess	James Ivory	Ismail Merchant	Ruth Prawer Jhabvala	original story	
1977	Roseland	James Ivory	Ismail Merchant	Ruth Prawer Jhabvala	original story	anthology film
1978	Hullabaloo Over Georgie and Bonnie's Pictures	James Ivory	Ismail Merchant	Ruth Prawer Jhabvala	original story	TV film
1979	The Europeans	James Ivory	Ismail Merchant	Ruth Prawer Jhabvala	based on the novel by Henry James	the first Merchant Ivory adaptation of a novel by James
1980	Jane Austen in Manhattan	James Ivory	Ismail Merchant	Ruth Prawer Jhabvala	Libretto "Sir Charles Grandison" by Jane Austen & Samuel Richardson, based on the play "Sir Charles Grandison, or The Happy Man" by Austen	
1981	Quartet	James Ivory	Ismail Merchant	Ruth Prawer Jhabvala	based on the novel by Jean Rhys	
1983	The Courtesans of Bombay	Ismail Merchant	Ismail Merchant	Ismail Merchant, James Ivory, and Ruth Prawer Jhabvala	original story	TV film
1983	Heat and Dust	James Ivory	Ismail Merchant	Ruth Prawer Jhabvala	based on the novel by Jhabvala	the second Merchant Ivory adaptation of a novel by Jhabvala
1984	The Bostonians	James Ivory	Ismail Merchant	Ruth Prawer Jhabvala	based on the novel by Henry James	the second Merchant Ivory adaptation of a novel by James
1985	A Room with a View	James Ivory	Ismail Merchant	Ruth Prawer Jhabvala	based on the novel by E. M. Forster	the first Merchant Ivory adaptation of a novel by Forster
1986	My Little Girl	Connie Kaiserman	Ismail Merchant (executive producer), Thomas F. Turley (line producer)	Connie Kaiserman and Nan Mason	original story	
1987	Maurice	James Ivory	Ismail Merchant	James Ivory and Kit Hesketh-Harvey	based on the novel by E. M. Forster	the second Merchant Ivory adaptation of a novel by Forster
1988	The Deceivers	Nicholas Meyer	Ismail Merchant	Michael Hirst	based on the novel by John Masters	
1988	The Perfect Murder	Zafar Hai	Ismail Merchant	H. R. F. Keating and Zafar Hai	based on the novel by Keating	
1989	Slaves of New York	James Ivory	Ismail Merchant, Gary Hendler, Fred Hughes (associate), and Vincent Fremont (associate)	Tama Janowitz	based on a collection of stories by Janowitz	
1990	Mr. & Mrs. Bridge	James Ivory	Ismail Merchant	Ruth Prawer Jhabvala	based on Mrs. Bridge and Mr. Bridge by Evan S. Connell	
1991	The Ballad of the Sad Café	Simon Callow	Ismail Merchant	Michael Hirst	based on the play by Edward Albee adapted from the novel by Carson McCullers	
1991	Street Musicians of Bombay	Richard Robbins	Wahid Chowhan, Ismail merchant (executive, uncredited), Shahnaz Vahanvaty (associate)	n/a	original story	documentary
1992	Howards End	James Ivory	Ismail Merchant	Ruth Prawer Jhabvala	based on the novel by E.M. Forster	the third adaptation of a novel by Forster
1993	In Custody	Ismail Merchant	Wahid Chowhan, Paul Bradley (executive), and Donald Rosenfeld (executive)	Shahrukh Husain and Anita Desai	based on the novel by Desai	
1993	The Remains of the Day	James Ivory	Ismail Merchant, Mike Nichols, and John Calley	Ruth Prawer Jhabvala and Harold Pinter (uncredited)	based on the novel by Kazuo Ishiguro	
1995	Feast of July	Christopher Menaul	Henry Herbert, Christopher Neame, Ismail Merchant (executive) and Paul Bradley (executive)	Christopher Neame	based on the novel by H. E. Bates	
1995	Jefferson in Paris	James Ivory	Ismail Merchant, Humbert Balsan, Paul Bradley and Donald Rosenfeld	Ruth Prawer Jhabvala	historical fiction	
1996	The Proprietor	Ismail Merchant	Humbert Balsan and Donald Rosenfeld	Jean-Marie Besset and George W. S. Trow	original story	
1996	Surviving Picasso	James Ivory	Ismail Merchant and David L. Wolper	Ruth Prawer Jhabvala	based on the book Picasso: Creator and Destroyer by Arianna Huffington	
1998	Side Streets	Tony Gerber	Bruce Weiss, Ismail Merchant (executive), Tom Borders (executive), and Gregory Cascante (executive)	Tony Gerber and Lynn Nottage	original story	
1998	A Soldier's Daughter Never Cries	James Ivory	Ismail Merchant	Ruth Prawer Jhabvala	based on the novel by Kaylie Jones	
1999	Cotton Mary	Ismail Merchant and Madhur Jaffrey	Nayeem Hafizka, Richard Hawley, Paul Bradley (executive), and Gil Donaldson (associate)	Alexandra Viets	original story	
2000	The Golden Bowl	James Ivory	Ismail Merchant	Ruth Prawer Jhabvala	based on the novel by Henry James	the third Merchant Ivory adaptation of a novel by James
2001	The Mystic Masseur	Ismail Merchant	Nayeem Haffizka and Richard Hawley	Caryl Phillips	based on the novel by V. S. Naipaul	
2002	Merci Docteur Rey	Andrew Litvack	Ismail Merchant	Andrew Litvack	original story	
2003	Le Divorce	James Ivory	Ismail Merchant and Michael Schiffer	James Ivory and Ruth Prawer Jhabvala	based on the novel by Diane Johnson	
2005	Heights	Chris Terrio	Richard Hawley, James Ivory, and Ismail Merchant	Amy Fox and Chris Terrio	original story by Fox	
2005	The White Countess	James Ivory	Ismail Merchant	Kazuo Ishiguro	original story	Ismail Merchant's final film
2007	Before the Rains	Santosh Sivan	Mark Burton, Paul Hardart, Tom Hardart, Doug Mankoff, and Andrew Spaulding	Cathy Rabin	adapted from the "Red Roofs" segment of the film Yellow Asphalt, written and directed by Danny Verete	the only remake by Merchant Ivory and the last Merchant Ivory film made without James Ivory or Ruth Prawer Jhabvala
2009	The City of Your Final Destination	James Ivory	Paul Bradley and Pierre Proner	Ruth Prawer Jhabvala	based the novel by Peter Cameron	the final Merchant Ivory film

== Academy Award wins and nominations ==
Year	Category	Nominee	Project	Result	Ref.
1979	Best Costume Design	Judy Moorcroft	The Europeans	Nominated	
1984	Best Actress	Vanessa Redgrave	The Bostonians	Nominated	
1984	Best Costume Design	Jenny Beavan and John Bright	The Bostonians	Nominated	
1986	Best Picture	Ismail Merchant	A Room with a View	Nominated	
1986	Best Director	James Ivory	A Room with a View	Nominated	
1986	Best Supporting Actor	Denholm Elliott	A Room with a View	Nominated	
1986	Best Supporting Actress	Maggie Smith	A Room with a View	Nominated	
1986	Best Adapted Screenplay	Ruth Prawer Jhabvala	A Room with a View	Won	
1986	Best Cinematography	Tony Pierce-Roberts	A Room with a View	Nominated	
1986	Best Production Design	Gianni Quaranta, Brian Ackland-Snow, Brian Savegar and Elio Altamura	A Room with a View	Won	
1986	Best Costume Design	Jenny Beavan and John Bright	A Room with a View	Won	
1987	Best Costume Design	Jenny Beavan and John Bright	Maurice	Nominated	
1990	Best Actress	Joanne Woodward	Mr. & Mrs. Bridge	Nominated	
1992	Best Picture	Ismail Merchant	Howards End	Nominated	
1992	Best Director	James Ivory	Howards End	Nominated	
1992	Best Actress	Emma Thompson	Howards End	Won	
1992	Best Supporting Actress	Vanessa Redgrave	Howards End	Nominated	
1992	Best Adapted Screenplay	Ruth Prawer Jhabvala	Howards End	Won	
1992	Best Cinematography	Tony Pierce-Roberts	Howards End	Nominated	
1992	Best Production Design	Gianni Quaranta, Brian Ackland-Snow, Brian Savegar and Elio Altamura	Howards End	Won	
1992	Best Costume Design	Jenny Beavan and John Bright	Howards End	Nominated	
1992	Best Original Score	Richard Robbins	Howards End	Nominated	
1993	Best Picture	Ismail Merchant	The Remains of the Day	Nominated	
1993	Best Director	James Ivory	The Remains of the Day	Nominated	
1993	Best Actor	Anthony Hopkins	The Remains of the Day	Nominated	
1993	Best Actress	Emma Thompson	The Remains of the Day	Nominated	
1993	Best Adapted Screenplay	Ruth Prawer Jhabvala	The Remains of the Day	Nominated	
1993	Best Production Design	Gianni Quaranta, Brian Ackland-Snow, Brian Savegar and Elio Altamura	The Remains of the Day	Nominated	
1993	Best Costume Design	Jenny Beavan and John Bright	The Remains of the Day	Nominated	
1993	Best Original Score	Richard Robbins	The Remains of the Day	Nominated	
