= Cotton Mary =

- Cover art for Cotton Mary (1999)
- Directed by: Ismail Merchant; Madhur Jaffrey (co-director)
- Written by: Alexandra Viets
- Produced by: Nayeem Hafizka; Richard Hawley; Paul Bradley (executive); Gil Donaldson (associate)
- Starring: Greta Scacchi; Madhur Jaffrey; James Wilby; Neena Gupta; Sarah Badel; Joanna David; Sakina Jaffrey; Gemma Jones; Nadira; Prayag Raj; Surekha Sikri; Laura Lumley
- Cinematography: Pierre Lhomme
- Edited by: John David Allen
- Music by: Richard Robbins
- Distributed by: Universal Pictures
- Release date: 17 December 1999 (UK)
- Running time: 124 minutes
- Countries: United Kingdom; France
- Language: English

Cotton Mary is a 1999 film co-directed by Ismail Merchant, best known as the producer half of Merchant Ivory, and the Indian actress and writer Madhur Jaffrey, who also co-starred. Most of story is about of the changes in the characters of Cotton Mary, a former hospital nurse, and her new employer, Lilly MacIntosh, as Mrs. MacIntosh deals with her inability to breastfeed her baby and employs Mary as a nanny. There is a subtext of Lilly's husband having an affair with Mary's niece who was a former co-worker at the hospital where Mary had worked. The film was shot in coastal South India.

== Plot ==
Set in the post-colonial era of 1950s India, Lily MacIntosh, an upper-class British woman living in India, has struggled since the birth of her second child and is unable to breastfeed her baby. In the old British military hospital where the child was born, a nurse known as Cotton Mary takes the post as nanny; she is an ambitious woman who is eager to be part of British society. She seems kind at first, but her true nature gradually reveals itself as she manipulates everyone around her to get what she wants.

Cotton Mary is an Indian woman proud of her British ancestry by means of her claim that her father was a British military officer. As a nurse and a Christian, she mentors her niece, a younger hospital aide and fellow Christian named Rosie as if she was her daughter. (Note: Sakina Jaffrey is actually Madhur Jaffrey's daughter in real life.) At the hospital, Mary resolves the issue of Lilly not being able to breast feed her child by bringing the baby to be breastfed by her sister Blossom, a wheelchair-bound wet nurse living in a slum nearby.

Because Mary solved the baby's feeding problem, she is hired by Lilly as a nanny and gradually becomes more powerful in the Macintosh household. However, Mary evolves into a corrupt character and causes the butler Abraham to lose his job based on various desperate ways to convince Lilly to terminate his employment. Despite the corruption, Mary later discovers that Rosie has had an affair with while working as the new translator for Lily's husband, BBC World Service journalist John MacIntosh, which is where Mary draws the line as to what is acceptable behaviour.

Mrs. MacIntosh later discovers the deception and corruption of Mary, from causing her key employee to unjustly lose his job at the household to Mary wearing the jewellery of Mrs. MacIntosh while inside the MacIntosh house.

When Lilly presents to Mary her initial concerns, Mary becomes upset and explains to Lilly that her husband had an affair with Rosie. Lilly then terminates Mary's employment. Lilly's husband departs from her as well because of Lilly discovering that he had a mistress. After the departure of her husband from the family, Lilly experiences a change in herself, is now able to breastfeed her child, and returns to the UK with her children. The film closes with Mary teaching a young girl the Lord's Prayer, a prayer that is part of the Christian culture. The camera pans away to a neighbouring Christian church, with sitar music playing as the film soundtrack. The film closes with a blend of the sights and sounds of Christian and Indian culture. (Note: Although the Christian church building at the end of the film could be interpreted as what the British had brought to India, Christianity in India traces its roots to a much earlier time than the time of the British arrival in India.)

== Critical response ==
Sight and Sound magazine described the film as:

Structurally, it can be seen as Lily's story as much as Mary's. If the surface problem motivating (and resolved in) the narrative is Lily's inability to breastfeed, the underlying problem is that both women are trapped within a dying colonial, patriarchal system which they do not know how to reject.

== Cast ==
- Greta Scacchi as Lily MacIntosh
- Madhur Jaffrey as Mary "Cotton Mary"
- James Wilby as John MacIntosh
- Sarah Badel as Mrs. Evans
- Riju Bajaj as "Mugs"
- Gerson da Cunha as Dr. Correa
- Joanna David as Mrs Smythe
- Neena Gupta as Blossom, Mary's Sister
- Sakina Jaffrey as Rosie
- Gemma Jones as Mrs. Freda Davids
- Firdausi Jussawalla as Mr. Panamal
- Mahabanoo Mody-Kotwal as Matron
- Nadira as Mattie
- Prayag Raaj as Abraham
- Captain Raju as Inspector Ramiji Raj
- Shobha Vijay as Ayah
- Virendra Saxena as Joseph
- Surekha Sikri as Gwen
- Laura Lumley as Theresa MacIntosh
- Matteo Piero Mantegazza as Baba
- Olivia Caesar as Baba
- Arshia Rafique as Mira
- Philip Tabor as Henry Campbell-Jones
- Luke Jones as Charlie
- Susan Malick as Bunny Rogers
- Hamza as Fisherman
- Poornima Mohan as Receptionist
- Txuku Iriarte Solana as Sylvie D'Costa
- Cuckoo Parameswaran as Nurse

== Reception ==
On Metacritic the film has a score of 52% based on reviews from 18 critics. On Rotten Tomatoes the film has an approval rating of 36% based on reviews from 33 critics.

Roger Ebert gave the film two out of four stars.
