= Merci Docteur Rey =

2002 comedy film directed by Andrew Litvack

- Theatrical release poster
- Directed by: Andrew Litvack
- Written by: Andrew Litvack
- Produced by: Ismail Merchant (executive)
- Starring: Dianne Wiest; Jane Birkin; Stanislas Merhar; Bulle Ogier
- Cinematography: Laurent Machuel
- Edited by: Giles Gardner
- Music by: Geoffrey Alexander; Giacomo Puccini (from opera "Turandot")
- Distributed by: Pan-Européenne Distribution
- Release date: 13 October 2002 (Mill Valley Film Festival)
- Running time: 91 minutes
- Country: France
- Languages: English; French
- Box office: $19,867

Merci Docteur Rey is a 2002 comedy film directed and written by Andrew Litvack. The film stars Dianne Wiest, Jane Birkin, Simon Callow, Jerry Hall, Vanessa Redgrave, Bulle Ogier, and Stanislas Merhar. It is produced by Ismail Merchant and his company Merchant Ivory Productions.

== Synopsis ==
Thomas Beaumont is a young man recruited into an illicit love triangle to watch a much older man's sexual liaison, but ends up witnessing what turns out to be the older man's murder. The next day his mother Elisabeth informs him that his estranged father has been in Paris until the previous night, when he was murdered. Seeking help with infamous psychiatrist Docteur Rey, the young man comes across Pénélope, an eccentric actress who has come totally unhinged by the death of Rey.

== Cast ==
- Dianne Wiest as Elisabeth Beaumont
- Jane Birkin as Pénélope
- Stanislas Merhar as Thomas Beaumont
- Bulle Ogier as Claude Sabrié
- Karim Saleh as Murderer
- Didier Flamand as Detective
- Roschdy Zem as Taxi Driver
- Nathalie Richard as Radio Interviewer
- Dan Herzberg as Rollerboy
- Jerry Hall as Sybil
- Simon Callow as Bob
- Vanessa Redgrave as herself

== Critical reception ==
On review aggregator website Rotten Tomatoes, the film has a rare approval rating of 0% based on 20 reviews, with an average rating of 3.5/10. The site's consensus is: "This overly wacky farce strains for sophistication but lacks polish and a coherent narrative."

== Home media ==
This film was released on DVD in Australia by Payless Entertainment.

== See also ==
- List of films with a 0% rating on Rotten Tomatoes
