= Adventures of a Brown Man in Search of Civilization =

1972 British documentary film

- Screenshot
- Directed by: James Ivory
- Written by: James Ivory
- Produced by: Anthony Korner; Ismail Merchant
- Starring: Nirad C. Chaudhuri; Barry Foster
- Cinematography: Walter Lassally
- Edited by: Kent McKinney
- Release date: 1 April 1972
- Running time: 54 minutes
- Country: United Kingdom
- Language: English

Adventures of a Brown Man in Search of Civilization (also known as Nirad Chaudhuri Adventures of a Brown Man in Search of Civilisation) is a 1972 color documentary film directed by James Ivory and narrated by Barry Foster. The film covers the life and thoughts of Indian writer Nirad C. Chaudhuri.

== Scenario ==
Chaudhuri (then based in London and Oxford) expounds his views on culture, history, religion and society from a comparative perspective.

== Reception ==
Sight and Sound wrote: "However barbed the comment, it is uttered with disarming sweetness of manner, and in a tone suggesting that its truth must be self-evident to all reasonable people. Chaudhuri, in fact, is one of those compulsive talkers who turn conversation into monologue. Boredom threatens; then, repeatedly, a phrase in his beautifully academic English or another waspish aphorism rivets the attention with its sense and sanity. Ivory patiently captures all the maddening and beguiling aspects of this forceful personality, watching him being measured for a suit and later dressing up in Regency ruffles for an Oxford dinner party, over which he reigns supreme like some elderly latter-day Beau. ... Ivory's cool, unstressed style, and Chaudhuri's apparent unconcern for the camera eye, combine to build up a portrait of a living, thinking human being; and there's a sense of a shared, ironically romantic reaction to Oxford by the American filmmaker and the Indian writer."

== Home media ==
The film is available in the DVD sets of several Merchant Ivory films.
