= The Mystic Masseur =

2001 film by Ismail Merchant

- Directed by: Ismail Merchant
- Written by: Caryl Phillips (based on the novel by V. S. Naipaul)
- Produced by: Nayeem Hafizka and Richard Hawley
- Starring: Om Puri; Aasif Mandvi; Ayesha Dharker
- Music by: Zakir Hussain; Richard Robbins
- Release date: 2001
- Country: Trinidad and Tobago
- Language: Trinidadian English

The Mystic Masseur is a 2001 Merchant Ivory film based on the novel of the same name by V. S. Naipaul. It is one of relatively few films directed by Ismail Merchant, who is better known as the producer in the Merchant Ivorypartnership, and addresses issues of Hindu subculture in Trinidad and Tobago.

The movie was the first film adaptation of a novel by Naipaul. It was filmed in Trinidad and Tobago and was released in 2001 to an indifferent response. The screenplay is by Caryl Phillips. The film features performances by Om Puri and Aasif Mandvi, and original music by Zakir Hussain.

== Synopsis ==
The novel by V. S. Naipaul moves between farce and acerbic social commentary on Trinidad, the country of his birth. The characters are mainly members of Trinidad's Indian community. The protagonist is Ganesh Ramsumair, a frustrated writer that rises from poverty on the back of his dubious talent as a "mystic" masseur, known as Pundit Ganesh, who can cure illnesses. In the end he becomes a successful colonial politician, under the name G. Ramsay Muir.

== Cast ==
- Om Puri as Ramlogan
- Aasif Mandvi as Ganesh Ramsumair
- Ayesha Dharker as Leela G. Ramsumair
- Jimi Mistry as Pratap Cooper
- Sanjeev Bhaskar as Beharry
- Zohra Sehgal as Auntie
- Sakina Jaffrey as Suruj Mooma
- Rez Kempton as Basdeo
- Pip Torrens as Governor
- Albert Laveau as Headmaster
- Grace Maharaj as Mrs Cooper
- James Fox as Mr Stewart
- Michael Cherrie as Man in yellow suit
- Maureen Thompson as Woman in rainbow dress
- Dinesh Maharaj as a Taxi driver
- Danesh Khan as Young Pratap Cooper

== Reception ==
Variety ended its balanced review with: "Despite all frustrating aspects, on the whole "The Mystic Masseur" succeeds as light entertainment – even if at the cost of the material's greater potential." Peter Bradshaw in The Guardian called the film a "forgettable 1950s period piece... the scenes look stitched together in the editing room without any cumulative sense that any of it is leading to anything at all". Time Out wrote, "fitful gags and some clever incidental detail... can't compensate for the plot's lumpen pace".
