= Ian Whittaker =

British set decorator and actor (1928–2022)

- Born: 13 July 1928; Paddington, London, England
- Died: 16 October 2022 (aged 94); Corfe Castle, Dorset, England
- Occupations: Set decorator, actor
- Years active: 1949–2009

Ian Roy Whittaker (13 July 1928 – 16 October 2022) was a British set decorator and actor. He won an Academy Award and was nominated three more times in the category Best Art Direction.

Whittaker was born at a maternity home in Paddington, London, England, on 13 July 1928. He later lived in Corfe Castle, a village in Dorset. He died there from prostate cancer on 16 October 2022, at the age of 94.

== Selected filmography ==
- Strange Experiences (1955) – Dora's Son

Whittaker won an Academy Award for Best Art Direction and was nominated for three more:

Won

- Howards End (1992)

Nominated

- Alien (1979)
- The Remains of the Day (1993)
- Anna and the King (1999)
