= The Guru (1969 film) =

1969 film by James Ivory

- Theatrical release poster
- Directed by: James Ivory
- Written by: Ruth Prawer Jhabvala; James Ivory
- Produced by: Ismail Merchant
- Starring: Rita Tushingham; Michael York; Utpal Dutt; Madhur Jaffrey; Barry Foster; Aparna Sen; Zohra Sehgal; Saeed Jaffrey
- Cinematography: Subrata Mitra
- Edited by: Prabhakar Supare; Humphrey Dixon (assistant)
- Music by: Ustad Vilayat Khan
- Production company: Merchant Ivory Productions
- Distributed by: 20th Century Fox
- Release date: 10 February 1969
- Running time: 112 min
- Countries: United States; India
- Languages: English; Urdu
- Budget: $970,000

The Guru is a 1969 film by Merchant Ivory Productions, with a screenplay by Ruth Prawer Jhabvala and James Ivory.

== Plot ==
A young pop-star, Tom Pickle (Michael York), travels to India to learn to play the sitar with the musician Ustad Zafar Khan (as George Harrison did when he studied under Ravi Shankar). Khan (Utpal Dutt) is not happy with his disciple but still takes him to Benares to meet his own guru. Throughout, Pickle struggles with the humility and meekness needed to study Indian music under a guru. Towards the end, Pickle returns to England but with a young English girl (Rita Tushingham) whom he met while in India.

== Cast ==
The following actors played a role in the movie,

- Rita Tushingham as Jenny
- Michael York as Tom Pickle
- Utpal Dutt as Ustad Zafar Khan
- Madhur Jaffrey as Begum Sahiba
- Barry Foster as Chris
- Aparna Sen as Ghazala
- Zohra Sehgal as Mastani
- Saeed Jaffrey as Murad

== Box office ==
Twentieth Century Fox offered to finance the movie, after Merchant Ivory had to shelve two other film projects. According to Fox records, the film required $1,675,000 in theatrical rentals to break even. By December 1970, it had only made $625,000 in rentals, causing the studio to take a loss. This was equivalent to estimated box office gross receipts of approximately $2 million.
