= Judy Moorcroft =

British costume designer (1933–1991)

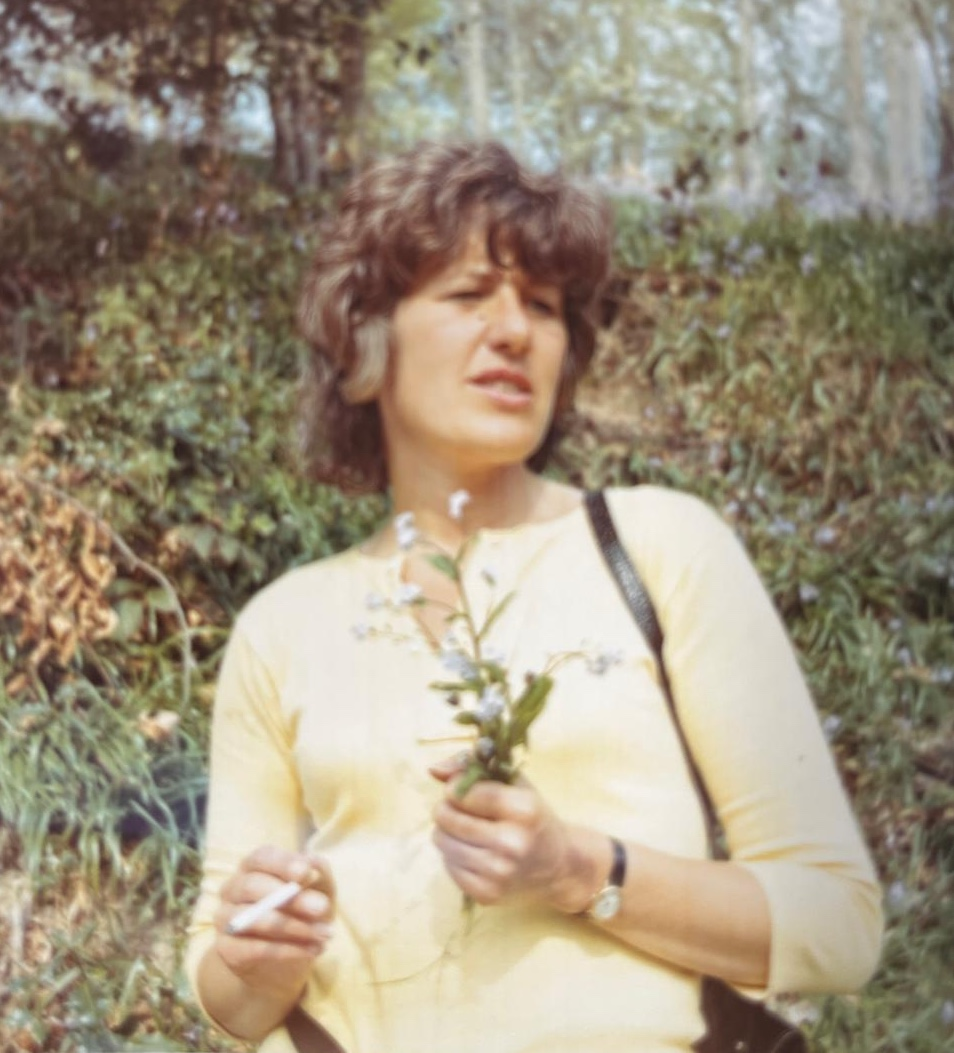
- Born: 21 September 1933
- Died: 13 December 1991 (aged 58)
- Occupation: Costume designer
- Years active: 1965–1991

Judy Moorcroft (21 September 1933 – 13 December 1991) was a British costume designer. She was nominated for two Academy Awards and three BAFTA Awards. Her film credits include The Europeans (1979), Quartet (1981), Yentl (1983), The Killing Fields (1984), A Passage to India (1984), and The Dressmaker (1988).

== Education and early career ==
Moorcroft studied dress design at Manchester College of Art in the early 1950s. After moving into costume, she started working at the BBC in 1964.

== Career ==
As costume designer for the 1977 film The Prince and the Pauper (American title Crossed Swords), Moorcroft worked with wardrobe mistresses Dorothy Edwards and Betty Adamson. She hired the London-based costumers Bermans & Nathans to make costumes, but also to hire stock costumes that had been used the films A Man for All Seasons and Anne of the Thousand Days. Despite working with a limited budget, Moorcroft's costumes for the film were described as "the most ornate and opulent ever seen on any movie set", and Moorcroft was quoted as saying, "the real talent comes in creating a first-rate wardrobe within the framework of your financial limits". Twenty-first-century critics have described Moorcroft's costumes for The Prince and the Pauper as "big, flashy and pretty".

Judy Moorcroft received her first nomination for an Academy Award and BAFTA for Best Costume Design for the Merchant-Ivory film The Europeans (1979), based on the Henry James novel of the same name and set in the 1840s. This was the first official 'Merchant Ivory' film, and the budget was very limited for an ambitiously authentic production. The director James Ivory, explained that Judy had been chosen for her BBC training, and described how she brought:

"almost an archaelogical, or a scientifically detached approach to the film's overall design, which made it stand out at a time when most period films – particularly ones made in America – looked pretty sloppy. For instance, in this film the actresses, as a matter of course, were required to be tightly laced up into corsets with stays (which made them stand, walk, and sit right)... I heard the costume designer [Judy Moorcroft] and hairdressers collaboratively discussing 'the line' – that all-important silhouette that ran from the top of an actor's (or actress's) correctly coiffed head, to the tips of his (or her) shoes, which defined the historical period exactly to within a year or two."

Moorcroft has been credited as setting the standard for Merchant-Ivory productions with her work on The Europeans. There were only three people on the costume team, including Jenny Beavan, who was Moorcroft's assistant on the film. They also worked with John Bright and his company Cosprop to make costumes for principal characters. When Moorcroft was unavailable for the next Merchant-Ivory film, Beavan stepped into the costume designer role for the first time.

Over the following years, Moorcroft designed costumes for Yentl (1983, starring and directed by Barbra Streisand), The Killing Fields (1984) and A Passage to India (1984).

The production of A Passage to India (1984) was challenging, and there was, according to the crew, a "tense mood on set", especially between director David Lean and the lead actor Judy Davis, who disagreed about the characterisation of Adela. This caused problems for the costume team, who had agreed designs subsequently dismissed as "too frumpy" by Lean. Moorcroft had the support of wardrobe mistress Rosemary Burrows and assistant designer Sally Turner to deliver what was required, and eventually Moorcroft received her second Academy Award and BAFTA nominations for the film.

By the time she came to work on The Murder of Mary Phagan (1988), an American TV mini-series, Moorcroft was recognised a s a "veteran" of the industry and her impressive list of projects encouraged directors to seek her out.

== Awards and nominations ==
Award	Year (Note: Indicates the year of ceremony. Each year is linked to the article about the awards held that year, wherever possible.)	Category	Work	Result	Ref.
Academy Awards	1980	Best Costume Design	The Europeans	Nominated	
Academy Awards	1985	Best Costume Design	A Passage to India	Nominated	
British Academy Film Awards	1980	Best Costume Design	The Europeans	Nominated	
British Academy Film Awards	1986	Best Costume Design	A Passage to India	Nominated	
British Academy Film Awards	1989	Best Costume Design	The Dressmaker	Nominated	
