= Roseland (film) =

1977 film by James Ivory

- film poster
- Directed by: James Ivory
- Written by: Ruth Prawer Jhabvala
- Produced by: Ismail Merchant
- Starring: Teresa Wright; Geraldine Chaplin
- Cinematography: Ernest Vincze
- Edited by: Humphrey Dixon; Richard Schmiechen
- Music by: Michael Gibson
- Release date: 1977
- Running time: 104 minutes
- Country: United States
- Language: English
- Budget: $375,000

Roseland is a 1977 Merchant Ivory Productions' anthology film with a screenplay by Ruth Prawer Jhabvala. It was directed by James Ivory and produced by Ismail Merchant.

The film is made up of three connected short features: The Waltz, The Hustle and The Peabody. All three stories share a theme of the protagonists trying to find the right dance partner, and all are set in the Roseland Ballroom in New York City.

== Plot ==
At Roseland, an older lady, May (Wright), with a light step, looks for the memory of her husband in the ballroom's mirrors. Stan (Jacobi), a cheerful older man steers May to brandy alexanders and away from her past.

Pauline (Copeland) is a middle-aged widow with the means to pay for the services of a younger gigolo, Russell (Walken) and share champagne with her Roseland friends, the dance teacher Cleo (Helen Gallagher) and the shy divorcee, Marilyn (Chaplin). Both Marilyn and Cleo fail to break Russell's attachment to the lifestyle that Pauline provides.

Rosa (Skala), a former Schrafft's cook and aspiring dance superstar makes it her mission to win The Peabody prize with her older partner, Arthur (Thomas) who is desperate to marry her.

== Cast ==
=== The Waltz ===
- Teresa Wright (May)
- Lou Jacobi (Stan)
- Don De Natale (Master of Ceremonies)
- Louise Kirtland (Ruby)
- Hetty Galen (Red-Haired Lady)
- Carol Culver (Young May)
- Denny Shearer (Eddie)

=== The Hustle ===
- Geraldine Chaplin (Marilyn)
- Helen Gallagher (Cleo)
- Joan Copeland (Pauline)
- Christopher Walken (Russell)
- Conrad Janis (George)
- Jayne Heller (Bella)
- Annette Rivera and Floyd Chisolm (Hustle Couple)
- Jeanmarie Evans (Cloakroom Attendant)

=== The Peabody ===
- Lilia Skala (Rosa)
- David Thomas (Arthur)
- Edward Kogan (Bartender)
- Madeline Lee (Camille)
- Stan Rubin (Bert)
- Dortha Duckworth (Ladies' Room Attendant)

== Production ==
=== Filming ===
Roseland was filmed in an almost pseudo-documentary style as an exploration of the lives of Roseland's customers. The vignettes are also purportedly based on true stories. Filming took place almost entirely in the Roseland Ballroom.

== Reception ==
The Washington Post explained that the film shows what "is mostly the sadness and faded dreams of dancers who look like they were around the day the doors first opened". The review praised how Ivory "effectively uses three romantic vignettes" as well as the "realistic" dialogue. John Simon called Roseland a piece of vulgar and inept filmmaking.
