= Howards End (film) =

1992 film

- Theatrical release poster
- Directed by: James Ivory
- Screenplay by: Ruth Prawer Jhabvala
- Based on: Howards End by E. M. Forster
- Produced by: Ismail Merchant
- Starring: Anthony Hopkins; Vanessa Redgrave; Helena Bonham Carter; Emma Thompson; James Wilby; Samuel West; Jemma Redgrave; Prunella Scales
- Cinematography: Tony Pierce-Roberts
- Edited by: Andrew Marcus
- Music by: Richard Robbins (score); Percy Grainger (opening titles and end titles)
- Production companies: Merchant Ivory Productions; Sumitomo Corporation; Imagica Corporation; Cinema Ten; JSB Japan Satellite Broadcasting, Inc. Ide Productions; FilmFour International
- Distributed by: Palace Pictures (United Kingdom); Sony Pictures Classics (United States)
- Release dates: 27 February 1992 (Premiere); 13 March 1992 (United States); 1 May 1992 (United Kingdom)
- Running time: 142 minutes
- Countries: United Kingdom; Japan; United States
- Language: English
- Budget: $8 million
- Box office: $32 million

Howards End is a 1992 historical romantic drama film directed by James Ivory, from a screenplay written by Ruth Prawer Jhabvala based on the 1910 novel by E. M. Forster. Marking Merchant Ivory Productions' third adaptation of a Forster novel (following 1985's A Room with a View and 1987's Maurice), it was the first film to be released by Sony Pictures Classics. The film's narrative explores class relations in turn-of-the-20th-century Britain, through events in the lives of the Schlegel sisters. The film stars Emma Thompson, Anthony Hopkins, Helena Bonham Carter and Vanessa Redgrave, with James Wilby, Samuel West, Jemma Redgrave and Prunella Scales in supporting roles.

The film was theatrically released on 13 March 1992 to critical acclaim and commercial success, grossing over $32 million on an $8 million budget. It was in competition at the 1992 Cannes Film Festival and won the 45th Anniversary Award. At the 65th Academy Awards, the film received a leading nine nominations including for Best Picture, and won three: Best Actress (for Thompson), Best Screenplay Based on Material Previously Produced or Published, and Best Art Direction. At the 46th British Academy Film Awards, it garnered a leading eleven nominations, winning two awards; Best Film and Best Actress (for Thompson).

== Plot ==
In Edwardian Britain, Helen Schlegel becomes engaged to Paul Wilcox during a moment of passion while staying at the Wilcox family's country home, Howards End. The Schlegels are an intellectual Anglo-German bourgeois family, while the Wilcoxes, led by hard-headed businessman Henry, are conservative and wealthy. Helen and Paul quickly decide against the engagement, but she has already sent a telegram informing her sister Margaret, leading to an uproar when the sisters' Aunt Juley arrives and causes a scene.

Months later in London, the Wilcoxes take a flat across the street from the Schlegels, whom they had met the previous year in Germany, and Margaret resumes her acquaintance with Ruth, Henry's wife. Howards End is owned by Ruth, and is her beloved childhood home, inherited from her family. The two women grow close as Mrs. Wilcox's health declines and, unbeknownst to Margaret, Ruth bequeaths Howards End to her on her deathbed. However, the Wilcoxes refuse to believe Ruth would leave the house to a relative stranger, and burn her informally-written directions. Henry develops an attraction to Margaret, assisting her in finding a new home and eventually proposing marriage, which she accepts.

The Schlegels have befriended Leonard Bast, a self-improving young clerk who lives with Jacky, a woman of dubious origins. The sisters pass along advice from Henry that the insurance company Leonard works for is heading for bankruptcy. As a result, Leonard quits and settles for a much lower-paying job, which is eventually eliminated leaving him without employment. Helen is later appalled to learn Henry's advice was wrong – Leonard's first employer was perfectly sound but will not re-employ him – and is enraged by Henry's indifference.

Months later, Henry and Margaret host the wedding of his daughter Evie at his Shropshire estate. Margaret is shocked when Helen arrives with the impoverished Leonard and Jacky. Considering Henry responsible for their plight, Helen demands his help, but Jacky drunkenly exposes Henry as a former lover from years ago. Henry is ashamed to be revealed as an adulterer, but Margaret forgives him and agrees to send the Basts away. Helen, upset with Margaret's decision to marry a man she now loathes, leaves for Germany, but not before giving in to her attraction for Leonard and having sex while out boating. Fearing the Basts will be penniless, Helen instructs her brother Tibby to give them over £5000 of her own money, but Leonard returns the cheque uncashed out of pride, and because of his own feelings for Helen.

Margaret and Henry marry, arranging to use Howards End as storage for Margaret's and her siblings' belongings. After months of hearing from Helen only through postcards, Margaret grows concerned. Helen returns to England when Aunt Juley falls ill, but avoids seeing her family. Believing Helen is mentally unstable, Margaret lures her to Howards End to collect her belongings, arriving herself with Henry and a doctor, and finds Helen is pregnant. Insisting on returning to Germany to raise her baby alone, Helen asks to stay the night at Howards End but Henry adamantly refuses, leading to an argument with Margaret.

Leonard, still living unhappily in poverty with Jacky, has a dream about how he first met Helen. Wanting to see her again, he travels to Howards End, arriving to find a very pregnant Helen, Margaret, and Henry's brutish eldest son, Charles. Realising Leonard is the baby's father, Charles assaults him for "dishonouring" Helen, and a bookcase collapses on Leonard, who dies of a heart attack. Margaret tells Henry that she is leaving him to help Helen raise her baby, and Henry breaks down, telling her the police inquest will charge Charles with manslaughter.

A year later, Paul, Evie, and Charles's wife, Dolly, gather at Howards End. Henry and Margaret are still together, living with Helen and her young son. A visibly aged Henry tells the others that upon his death, Margaret will inherit Howards End and leave it to her nephew, but Margaret wants none of Henry's money, which will be split among his children. She overhears Dolly point out the irony of Margaret's inheriting the house, revealing Mrs. Wilcox's dying wish to leave it to her. Henry tells Margaret he did what he thought was right, but she says nothing.

== Cast ==
- Emma Thompson as Margaret Schlegel
- Anthony Hopkins as Henry Wilcox
- Helena Bonham Carter as Helen Schlegel
- Vanessa Redgrave as Ruth Wilcox
- James Wilby as Charles Wilcox
- Jemma Redgrave as Evie Wilcox
- Samuel West as Leonard Bast
- Joseph Bennett as Paul Wilcox
- Prunella Scales as Aunt Juley
- Adrian Ross Magenty as Tibby Schlegel
- Jo Kendall as Annie
- Susie Lindeman as Dolly Wilcox
- Nicola Duffett as Jacky Bast
- Mark Payton as Percy Cahill
- Barbara Hicks as Miss Avery
- Peter Cellier as Colonel Fussell

== Production ==
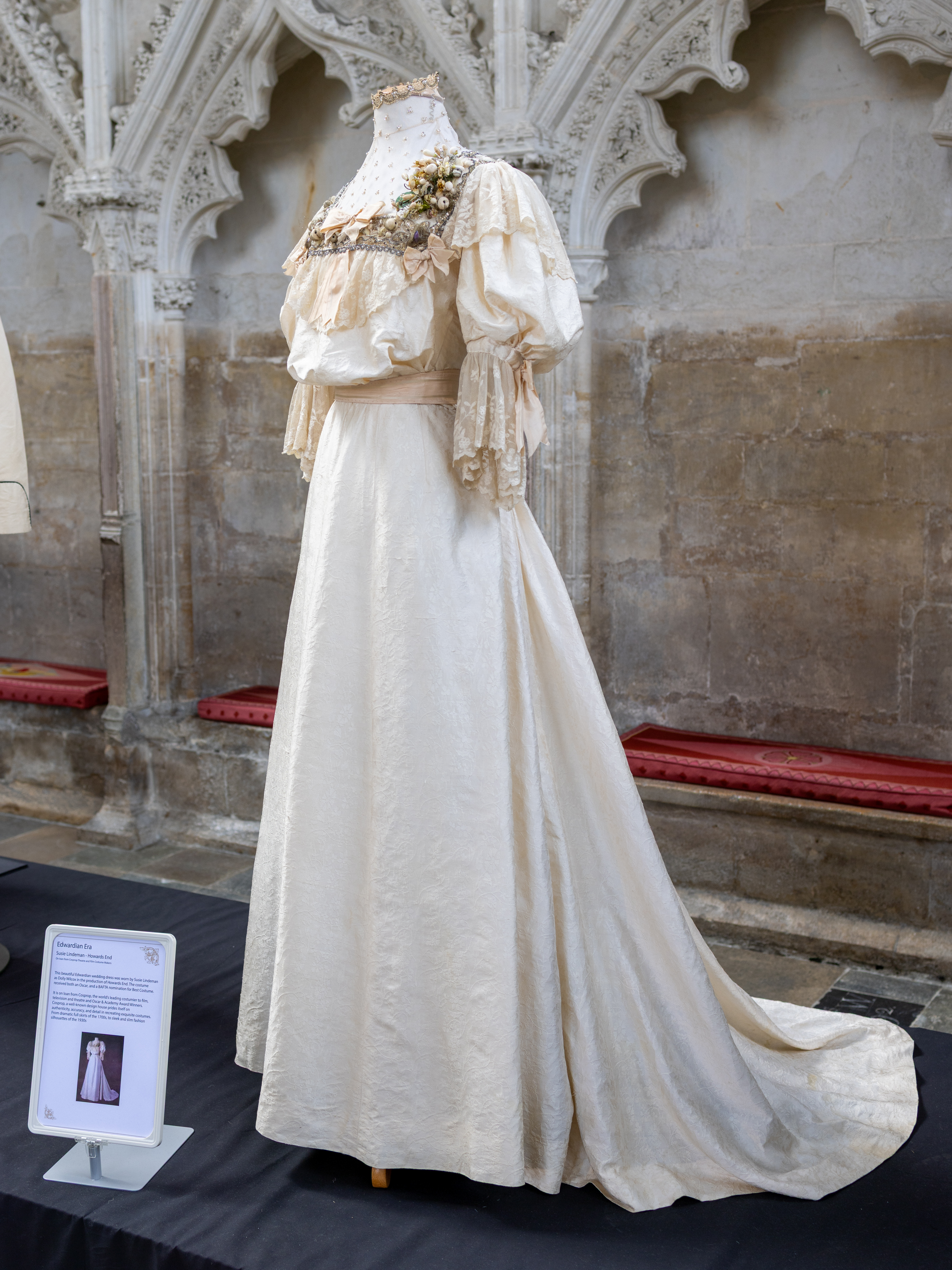
Wedding dress worn by Susie Lindeman as Dolly Wilcox in the film

=== Financing ===
Merchant-Ivory had difficulty securing funding for Howards End, whose budget stood at $8 million. This was considerably larger than those of Maurice and A Room with a View, which led to trouble in raising capital in the UK and the United States. Orion Pictures, the film's distributor, was on the verge of bankruptcy and contributed only a small amount to the overall budget.

A solution presented itself when Merchant Ivory sought funding through an intermediary in Japan, where the previous Forster adaptations, particularly Maurice, had been very successful. Eventually Japanese companies including the Sumitomo Corporation, Japan Satellite Broadcasting, and the Imagica Corporation provided the bulk of the film's financing.

The distribution problem was solved when the heads of Orion Classics departed the company for Sony Pictures, creating the entirely new division of Sony Pictures Classics; Howards End was the first title it acquired and distributed. In 2022, the division's co-founder Michael Barker recalled that, despite a highly lucrative offer for distribution rights from Harvey Weinstein of Miramax Films, Ismail Merchant was content choosing Sony's relatively smaller offer of $1 million instead.

=== Casting ===
Anthony Hopkins accepted the part of Henry Wilcox after reading the script, passed to him by a young woman who was helping edit Slaves of New York and The Silence of the Lambs simultaneously in the same building.

Phoebe Nicholls, Joely Richardson, Miranda Richardson, Natasha Richardson and Tilda Swinton were all considered for the part of Margaret Schlegel before Emma Thompson accepted the role. James Ivory was unfamiliar with Thompson before she was recommended to him by Simon Callow, who had a small cameo appearance as the music lecturer in the concert scene.

Jemma Redgrave (Evie Wilcox), who played the daughter of Vanessa Redgrave's character (Ruth Wilcox), is her niece off-screen. Samuel West, who played Leonard Bast, is the son of Prunella Scales, who played Aunt Juley.

According to James Ivory, although Vanessa Redgrave was his preferred choice for the role of Ruth Wilcox, her participation was uncertain until the last moment, because she was committed to other projects and it took some time to negotiate an acceptable salary. When she did agree to play Mrs. Wilcox, she mistakenly believed she would be playing Margaret; only when she showed up on set to begin filming her scenes did the person in Hair and Makeup explain that she would be playing the elder Mrs. Wilcox.

=== Music ===
The score was composed by Richard Robbins, with elements of the score based on Percy Grainger's works "Bridal Lullaby" and "Mock Morris". The piano pieces were performed by English concert pianist Martin Jones. Orchestral works were conducted by Harry Rabinowitz and performed by the English Chamber Orchestra.

- "Bridal Lullaby" by Percy Grainger
  Courtesy of Bardie Edition (used for the main title and Margaret's Arrival at Howards End)
- "Mock Morris" by Percy Grainger
  Courtesy of Schott & Co. (End Credits theme)
- 5th Symphony by Ludwig van Beethoven
  (uncredited; featured in the lecture scene 'Music and Meaning')

Also of note is a Tango composed and performed by the Teddy Peiro Tango Quintet, and the music of Francis Poulenc, the Nocturne #8. This theme is used while Ruth Wilcox walks at Howards End in the Evening Scene.

=== Filming locations ===
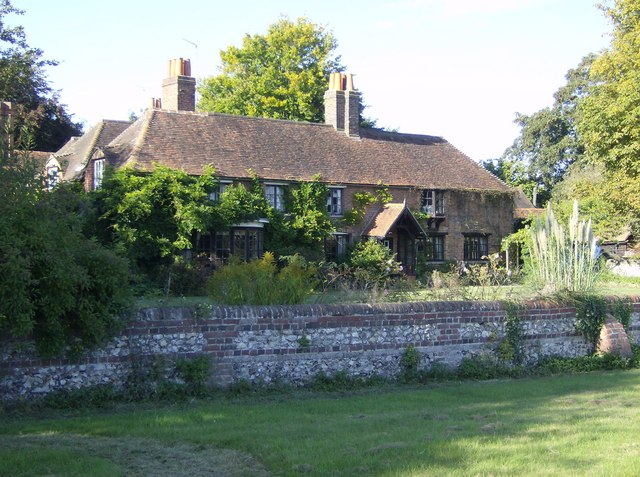
Peppard Cottage in Rotherfield Peppard was used as a filming location for Howards End.

Filming locations in London included a house in Victoria Square (which stood in for the Schlegel home), Fortnum & Mason in Piccadilly, Simpson's-in-the-Strand restaurant, and St Pancras railway station. Areas around the Admiralty Arch and in front of the Royal Exchange in the City of London were dressed to film traffic scenes of 1910 London. The scene where Margaret and Helen stroll with Henry in the evening was filmed on Chiswick Mall in Chiswick, London. The bank where Leonard encounters Helen is the lobby of the Baltic Exchange, 30 St. Mary Axe, London. Soon after filming the building was bombed and destroyed by the IRA. The Rosewood London on High Holborn, which was then the Pearl Assurance Building, represented the Porphyrion Fire Insurance Company.

The quadrangle of the Founder's Building at Royal Holloway, University of London stood in for the hospital where Margaret visits Mrs. Wilcox. The "Howards End" house in the countryside is Peppard Cottage in Rotherfield Peppard, Oxfordshire. At the time it was owned by an antique silver dealer with whom production designer Luciana Arrighi was acquainted. The bluebell wood where Leonard strolls in his dream, as well as Dolly and Charles' house, were filmed nearby. Henry's country house, Honiton, was actually Brampton Bryan Hall in Herefordshire, near the Welsh border. Bewdley railway station on the historic Severn Valley Railway featured as Hilton station.

== Release ==
=== Theatrical release ===
Howards End had its premiere in New York City on 27 February 1992. It was released on 13 March 1992 in the United States and Canada and on 1 May 1992 in the United Kingdom.

=== Home media ===
Columbia-TriStar released the film on LaserDisc on 2 June 1993. The Criterion Collection released Blu-ray and DVD versions of the film on 3 November 2009, which have since gone out of print. The release was unfortunately subject to a bronzing issue due to a problem at the factory with pressing, which could discolour the disc bronze and render it unplayable. However, not every disc was subject to bronzing. Cohen Film Collection released their own special edition Blu-ray on 6 December 2016. Although this edition was labelled as remastered in 4k, it is a 1080p Blu-ray disc. In 2018, Concord Video released a 4K Ultra HD Region Free edition in Germany.

== Reception ==
=== Box office ===
The film grossed $26.3 million in the United States and Canada. In the United Kingdom it grossed £4 million ($5.9 million).

=== Critical reception ===
The film received widespread critical acclaim. On 5 June 2005, Roger Ebert included it on his list of "Great Movies". Leonard Maltin awarded the film 4 stars out of 4, and called the film "Extraordinarily good on every level." Dave Kehr of The Chicago Tribune gave a mixed review while reporting that the film "provides more than enough in the way of production values to keep its primary audience entertained. An audible gasp went up at a recent sneak preview over the film's re-creation of a Christmas-bedecked Harrod's of the turn of the century; the movie, like the store, knows how to put its merchandise on display."

Review aggregator Rotten Tomatoes reports that 94% of 69 reviews are positive for the film, and the average rating is 8.3/10. The site's critical consensus reads, "A superbly-mounted adaptation of E.M. Forster's tale of British class tension, with exceptional performances all round, Howards End ranks among the best of Merchant-Ivory's work." On Metacritic, the film holds a score of 88 out of 100, based on 11 reviews, indicating "universal acclaim". American audiences surveyed by CinemaScore gave the film a grade "B" on a scale of A+ to F.

In 2016, the film was selected for screening as part of the Cannes Classics section at the 2016 Cannes Film Festival, and was released theatrically after restoration on 26 August 2016.

Howards End was placed on more top ten lists than any other film in 1992, edging out The Player and Unforgiven. It was placed on 82 of the 106 film critics polled.

=== Awards and nominations ===
Award	Category	Nominee(s)	Result	Ref.
Academy Awards	Best Picture	Ismail Merchant	Nominated	
Academy Awards	Best Director	James Ivory	Nominated	
Academy Awards	Best Actress	Emma Thompson	Won	
Academy Awards	Best Supporting Actress	Vanessa Redgrave	Nominated	
Academy Awards	Best Screenplay – Based on Material Previously Produced or Published	Ruth Prawer Jhabvala	Won	
Academy Awards	Best Art Direction	Art Direction: Luciana Arrighi; Set Decoration: Ian Whittaker	Won	
Academy Awards	Best Cinematography	Tony Pierce-Roberts	Nominated	
Academy Awards	Best Costume Design	Jenny Beavan and John Bright	Nominated	
Academy Awards	Best Original Score	Richard Robbins	Nominated	
American Society of Cinematographers Awards	Outstanding Achievement in Cinematography in Theatrical Releases	Tony Pierce-Roberts	Nominated	
Argentine Film Critics Association Awards	Best Foreign Film	James Ivory	Nominated	
Bodil Awards	Best European Film	James Ivory	Won	
Boston Society of Film Critics Awards	Best Actress	Emma Thompson	Won	
British Academy Film Awards	Best Film	Ismail Merchant and James Ivory	Won	
British Academy Film Awards	Best Direction	James Ivory	Nominated	
British Academy Film Awards	Best Actress in a Leading Role	Emma Thompson	Won	
British Academy Film Awards	Best Actor in a Supporting Role	Samuel West	Nominated	
British Academy Film Awards	Best Actress in a Supporting Role	Helena Bonham Carter	Nominated	
British Academy Film Awards	Best Adapted Screenplay	Ruth Prawer Jhabvala	Nominated	
British Academy Film Awards	Best Cinematography	Tony Pierce-Roberts	Nominated	
British Academy Film Awards	Best Costume Design	Jenny Beavan and John Bright	Nominated	
British Academy Film Awards	Best Editing	Andrew Marcus	Nominated	
British Academy Film Awards	Best Make Up Artist	Christine Beveridge	Nominated	
British Academy Film Awards	Best Production Design	Luciana Arrighi	Nominated	
British Society of Cinematographers Awards	Best Cinematography in a Theatrical Feature Film	Tony Pierce-Roberts	Won	
Camerimage	Golden Frog	Tony Pierce-Roberts	Nominated	
Cannes Film Festival	Palme d'Or	James Ivory	Nominated	
Cannes Film Festival	45th Anniversary Prize	James Ivory	Won	
César Awards	Best Foreign Film	James Ivory	Nominated	
Chicago Film Critics Association Awards	Best Actress	Emma Thompson	Won	
Dallas–Fort Worth Film Critics Association Awards	Best Film		Nominated	
Dallas–Fort Worth Film Critics Association Awards	Best Actress	Emma Thompson	Won	
David di Donatello Awards	Best Foreign Film	James Ivory	Nominated	
David di Donatello Awards	Best Foreign Actor	Anthony Hopkins	Nominated	
David di Donatello Awards	Best Foreign Actress	Emma Thompson	Won (Note: Tied with Emmanuelle Béart for A Heart in Winter and Tilda Swinton for Orlando.)	
Directors Guild of America Awards	Outstanding Directorial Achievement in Motion Pictures	James Ivory	Nominated	
Evening Standard British Film Awards	Best Film	James Ivory	Won	
Evening Standard British Film Awards	Best Actress	Emma Thompson (also for Peter's Friends)	Won	
Golden Camera	Best International Actress	Vanessa Redgrave (also for Young Catherine)	Won	
Golden Globe Awards	Best Motion Picture – Drama		Nominated	
Golden Globe Awards	Best Actress in a Motion Picture – Drama	Emma Thompson	Won	
Golden Globe Awards	Best Director – Motion Picture	James Ivory	Nominated	
Golden Globe Awards	Best Screenplay – Motion Picture	Ruth Prawer Jhabvala	Nominated	
Independent Spirit Awards	Best Foreign Film		Nominated	
Kansas City Film Critics Circle Awards	Best Actress	Emma Thompson	Won	
London Film Critics Circle Awards	British Film of the Year		Won	
London Film Critics Circle Awards	British Actress of the Year	Emma Thompson	Won	
Los Angeles Film Critics Association Awards	Best Actress	Emma Thompson	Won	
Nastro d'Argento	Best Foreign Director	James Ivory	Nominated	
Nastro d'Argento	Best Production Design	Luciana Arrighi	Won	
National Board of Review Awards	Best Film		Won	
National Board of Review Awards	Top Ten Films		Won	
National Board of Review Awards	Best Director	James Ivory	Won	
National Board of Review Awards	Best Actress	Emma Thompson	Won	
National Society of Film Critics Awards	Best Actress	Emma Thompson	Won	
National Society of Film Critics Awards	Best Supporting Actress	Vanessa Redgrave	3rd Place	
New York Film Critics Circle Awards	Best Film		Runner-up	
New York Film Critics Circle Awards	Best Director	James Ivory	Runner-up	
New York Film Critics Circle Awards	Best Actress	Emma Thompson	Won	
Political Film Society Awards	Democracy		Nominated	
Producers Guild of America Awards	Outstanding Producer of Theatrical Motion Pictures	Ismail Merchant	Nominated	
Southeastern Film Critics Association Awards	Best Picture		Won	
Southeastern Film Critics Association Awards	Best Actress	Emma Thompson	Won	
USC Scripter Awards		Ruth Prawer Jhabvala (screenwriter); E. M. Forster (author)	Nominated	
Writers Guild of America Awards	Best Screenplay – Based on Material Previously Produced or Published	Ruth Prawer Jhabvala	Nominated	
