= The White Countess =

- Original poster
- Directed by: James Ivory
- Written by: Kazuo Ishiguro
- Produced by: Ismail Merchant
- Starring: Ralph Fiennes; Natasha Richardson; Vanessa Redgrave; Hiroyuki Sanada; Lynn Redgrave; Allan Corduner; Madeleine Potter
- Cinematography: Christopher Doyle
- Edited by: John David Allen
- Music by: Richard Robbins
- Distributed by: Sony Pictures Classics
- Release date: 21 December 2005
- Running time: 135 minutes
- Countries: United Kingdom; United States; China
- Language: English
- Budget: $30 million (£17 million)
- Box office: $4,092,682

The White Countess is a 2005 drama film directed by James Ivory and starring Ralph Fiennes, Natasha Richardson, Vanessa Redgrave, Hiroyuki Sanada, Lynn Redgrave, Allan Corduner, and Madeleine Potter. The screenplay by Kazuo Ishiguro focuses on a disparate group of displaced persons attempting to survive in Shanghai in the late 1930s.

== Plot ==
Having escaped the 1917 Bolshevik Revolution in Russia, Countess Sofia Belinskaya is working as a taxi dancer and prostitute in a seedy Shanghai bar in 1936. Sofia is the sole support of her family of aristocratic White Russian émigrés, including her daughter Katya, her mother-in-law Olga, her sister-in-law Grushenka, and an aunt and uncle by marriage, Princess Vera and Prince Peter. Despite living off of it, Sofia's relatives scorn her for her work by treating her like an unclean woman, with the exception of Katya, who defends her mother.

Sofia meets Todd Jackson, a former official of the US State Department who years before lost first his wife and child, then later a daughter in separate terrorist bombings. The bombing that killed his daughter also blinded him. On his first visit to the bar, Todd overhears someone refer to Sofia as a “countess.” Sofia approaches Todd and urges him to dance. Sofia warns him that he should not wear such expensive clothes there and that he has come to the attention of gangsters who intend to victimize him. She convinces him to leave with her and pretend to be a client, as the gangsters do not interfere with the prostitutes' clientele. Outside of the club, Todd thanks Sofia, impressed by her character.

With his job at risk and dreaming of running a nightclub, Todd gambles his savings on a bet at the racetrack. Winning, he opens an elegant nightclub catering to rich cosmopolites and invites Sofia to be his principal hostess, as she is the very commodity for whom he has been searching—an aristocrat who can serve as a novelty hostess for his establishment. He intends to call the club "The White Countess.” Todd assures Sofia that her duties are only to serve as a hostess and dance with clients. Sofia accepts.

As the nightclub thrives, Todd and Sofia draw closer to each other, but strive to keep work separate from their personal lives. Meanwhile, Sofia's family considers her neighbor and friend, Mr. Feinstein, beneath them because he is Jewish.

Then, the Second Sino-Japanese War starts. Fearing the impending Japanese invasion of Shanghai, Sofia's relatives enlist the help of émigré contacts at the French embassy to help them get papers and tickets to leave and appeal to Sofia for $300 to cover costs. Sofia borrows the money from Todd, who is sorry to see her go but encourages her to leave if she fears for her own safety. Sofia tries to convince Todd to leave Shanghai as well, to no avail.

Sofia's relatives purchase everything required to leave Shanghai, taking Katya with them, but are short of funds to buy papers for Sofia to accompany them to Hong Kong. Sofia is shocked that they have not consulted her with their arrangements to leave. In response, they say that her presence among the émigré community would keep them out of society since her actions in Shanghai are known. Sofia agrees to pretend that she will be joining them later so Katya will go with her aunts without alarm. Mr. Feinstein later finds Sofia, realizes she has been abandoned by her family, and encourages her to get Katya back and join him and his wife in their flight to Macau that evening.

Todd is encouraged to leave Shanghai by Mr. Matsuda, a sympathetic Japanese business associate who has connections with the impending invaders. Todd is reluctant to leave his nightclub and is angry with Matsuda, blaming him for working in Japanese political interests. Matsuda unapologetically suggests Todd should begin a new life with "the real White Countess.” Todd sets out to find her and Katya. Amid the chaos of departing Europeans, Todd’s chauffeur abandons him on the streets of Shanghai. Todd is eventually spotted by Mr. Feinstein, who is looking for Katya with Sofia. The three eventually find Sofia's family boarding the ship to Hong Kong, and Sofia retrieves Katya despite Grushenka’s resistance. Sofia then urges Todd to leave with them for Macau, and Todd suggests that they can help each other in their new lives. Todd, Sofia, and Katya join the Feinsteins aboard the ship bound for Macau.

== Cast ==
- Ralph Fiennes as Todd Jackson
- Natasha Richardson as Countess Sofia Belinskaya
- Hiroyuki Sanada as Mr. Matsuda
- Lynn Redgrave as Olga Belinskaya
- Vanessa Redgrave as Princess Vera Belinskaya
- Madeleine Potter as Grushenka
- Madeleine Daly as Katya
- Lee Pace as Crane
- Ying Da as Kao
- Allan Corduner as Samuel Feinstein
- John Wood as Prince Peter Belinski

== Production ==
Ismail Merchant had previously worked with British author Kazuo Ishiguro, whose Booker Prize-winning novel The Remains of the Day had been adapted into one of Merchant Ivory's most successful films. Ivory initially asked Ishiguro to adapt the Junichiro Tanizaki novel The Diary of a Mad Old Man, but he wrote an original screenplay based on his obsession with Shanghai. Merchant said: "To have a writer of this calibre working with you is wonderful...I don’t know of any other writer who would be so keenly able to reflect the details of life at that time." Andre Morgan joined the project as executive producer and the film used his studio in Shanghai for production and post-production.

In The Making of The White Countess, a bonus feature on the DVD release of the film, production designer Andrew Sanders discusses the difficulties he had recreating 1930s Shanghai in a city where most pre-war remnants are surrounded by modern skyscrapers and neon lights. Many of the sets had to be constructed on soundstages. Also impeding him were restrictions on imports levied by the Chinese government, forcing him to make do with whatever materials he could find within the country. The film was the last for producer Ismail Merchant, who died shortly after principal photography was completed.

Cinematographer Chris Doyle said of his work on the film that "What I'm trying to do is make the camerawork lyrical rather than fragmentary. It's a dance between the camera and the actors."

In 2003, Variety noted the production budget was $16 million, while a 2006 The Guardian article reported the budget at $30 million (£17 million).

== Release ==
The film premiered at the Savannah Film Festival in Savannah, Georgia, and was shown at the Two River Film Festival in Monmouth County, New Jersey, before going into limited release in the US. It opened on ten screens, and earned $46,348 on its opening weekend, ranking No. 34 among all films in release. It eventually grossed $1,669,971 in the U.S and $2,422,711 in other markets, for a total worldwide box office of $4,092,682.

=== Critical response ===
On Rotten Tomatoes, the film has an approval rating of 49% based on 89 reviews, with average rating of 5.92/10. The website's critical consensus reads, "High production values and fine performances get bogged down by a lifeless story that fails to engage the viewer." On Metacritic, the film has a weighted average score of 60 out of 100, based on reviews from 30 critics, indicating "mixed or average reviews".

Stephen Holden of the New York Times said, "You couldn't ask for a tonier cast than the one that gamely tries to pump oxygen into the thin, filtered air of The White Countess ... But with its tentative pace, fussy, pieced-together structure and stuffy emotional climate, [the film] never develops any narrative stamina ... [It] has the familiar Merchant-Ivory trademarks: cultivated dialogue, a keen eye for the nuances of upscale society and a sophisticated, internationalist view of class and ethnicity. What is missing from a film that wants to be an Asian Casablanca crossed with The English Patient is a racing, dramatic pulse. Its sedate tone is simply too refined for the story it has to tell. Mr. Ishiguro's prim, anemic screenplay is so lacking in drive and emotional gravitas that the actors are left with only scraps of lean dramatic meat to tear into."

Roger Ebert of the Chicago Sun-Times stated, "Fiennes and Richardson make this film work with the quiet strangeness of their performances" and then observed, "I saw my first Merchant and Ivory film, Shakespeare Wallah, in 1965 ... Sometimes they have made great films, sometimes flawed ones, even bad ones, but never shabby or unworthy ones. Here is one that is good to better, poignant, patient, moving."

Mick LaSalle of the San Francisco Chronicle said of the film, "Measured and meticulous, with small patches of narrative awkwardness that are more than compensated for by rich performances, it's an appropriate finish to the 40-year partnership: a typical, above-average Merchant-Ivory film ... The movie has a slow start, but Ivory is laying in foundations for later ... Long before the climax, which is magnificent, the movie has us completely believing in the characters and their histories and marveling at their extraordinary circumstances. This is Merchant-Ivory's kind of showmanship, the unflashy adult variety of movie magic that they made their hallmark."

Carina Chocano of the Los Angeles Times stated, "The Chekovian sight of so many Richardson-Redgraves lamenting their circumstances in heavily Russian-accented English and pining for Hong Kong, where their former social glory will be restored, makes you wonder if they'd have been better off in a stage production of Three and a Half Sisters: The Twilight Years ... The White Countess takes place in a fascinating time and place, rife with conflict and turmoil. But to watch Fiennes float (and Richardson trudge) through it all, absorbed in themselves and their own private misery, is to wish they'd started falling earlier, if only to knock some sense into them."

Peter Travers of Rolling Stone rated the film three out of four stars and commented, "The convoluted screenplay ... makes it hard for director James Ivory to maintain an emotional through-line. But Richardson ... finds the story's grieving heart. Fiennes is her match in soulful artistry. As the last film from the legendary team of Ivory and producer Ismail Merchant ... The White Countess is a stirring tribute to Merchant, a true builder of dreams in an industry now sorely bereft of his unique spirit."

Justin Chang of Variety stated, "The threads come together ever so slowly in The White Countess ... This final production from the team of James Ivory and the late Ismail Merchant is itself adrift in more ways than one, with a literate but meandering script ... that withholds emotional payoffs to an almost perverse degree. Name cast and typically tasteful presentation should spark biz among sophisticated older viewers, though likely a fraction of what the Merchant Ivory pedigree used to command theatrically."

=== Accolades ===
At the 10th Satellite Awards, the film was nominated for Best Costume Design (John Bright) and Best Sound (Mixing & Editing) (Michael Barry, Martin Czembor, Ludovic Hénault, Robert Hein).

== See also ==
- The Shanghai Drama (1938)
- A Countess from Hong Kong (1967)
