= The Remains of the Day (film) =

1993 drama film directed by James Ivory

- Theatrical-release poster
- Directed by: James Ivory
- Screenplay by: Ruth Prawer Jhabvala; Harold Pinter (uncredited)
- Based on: The Remains of the Day by Kazuo Ishiguro
- Produced by: Ismail Merchant; Mike Nichols; John Calley
- Starring: Anthony Hopkins; Emma Thompson; James Fox; Christopher Reeve; Peter Vaughan; Hugh Grant; Michael Lonsdale; Tim Pigott-Smith
- Cinematography: Tony Pierce-Roberts
- Edited by: Andrew Marcus
- Music by: Richard Robbins
- Color process: Technicolor
- Production company: Merchant Ivory Productions
- Distributed by: Columbia Pictures
- Release dates: 25 October 1993 (Premiere); 4 November 1993 (London Film Festival); 5 November 1993 (United States)
- Running time: 134 minutes
- Countries: United Kingdom; United States
- Language: English
- Budget: $15 million
- Box office: $63.9 million

The Remains of the Day is a 1993 drama film adapted from the Booker Prize–winning 1989 novel by Kazuo Ishiguro. The film was directed by James Ivory, produced by Ismail Merchant, Mike Nichols, and John Calley and adapted by Ruth Prawer Jhabvala. It stars Anthony Hopkins as James Stevens and Emma Thompson as Miss Kenton, with James Fox, Christopher Reeve, Hugh Grant, Ben Chaplin, and Lena Headey in supporting roles.

The Remains of the Day was released by Columbia Pictures on 5 November 1993. The film was a critical and box office success and it was nominated for eight Academy Awards, including Best Picture, Best Actor (Hopkins), Best Actress (Thompson) and Best Adapted Screenplay (Jhabvala). In 1999, the British Film Institute ranked The Remains of the Day the 64th-greatest British film of the 20th century.

== Plot ==
In 1958 postwar Britain, Stevens, the butler of Darlington Hall, receives a letter from the former housekeeper, Miss Kenton, now Mrs. Benn. Their past employer, the Earl of Darlington, has died a broken man, his reputation destroyed by his pre–Second World War support of Nazi Germany, and his stately country house has been sold to retired US Congressman Jack Lewis. Allowed to borrow the Daimler, Stevens sets off for the West Country to see Miss Kenton for the first time in decades.

In the 1930s, Kenton arrives at Darlington Hall, where the ever-efficient but deeply repressed Stevens derives his entire identity from his profession. He butts heads with the warmer, strong-willed Kenton, particularly when he refuses to acknowledge that his father, now an under-butler, is no longer able to perform his duties.

Displaying total professionalism, Stevens carries on as his father lies dying during Darlington's conference of like-minded fascist-sympathising British and European aristocrats. Also in attendance is U.S. Congressman Lewis, who admonishes the "gentleman politicians" as meddling amateurs, advising that "Europe has become the arena of Realpolitik" and warning of impending disaster.

Exposed to Nazi racial laws, Darlington gets Stevens to dismiss two newly hired refugee German-Jewish maids. Kenton threatens to resign but has nowhere to go, and a regretful Darlington is later unable to rehire the maids. At another conference, Stevens is unable to answer an aristocratic guest's questions on global trade and politics, which the aristocrat claims demonstrates the lower classes' ignorance and inability to govern themselves.

Relations thaw between Stevens and Kenton, and she clearly shows her feelings for him. But the outwardly detached Stevens remains dedicated solely to his role as butler. She catches him reading a romance novel, which he explains is to improve his vocabulary, asking her to not invade his privacy again.

Lord Darlington's godson, journalist Reginald Cardinal, arrives on the day of a secret meeting at Darlington Hall between the British Prime Minister, Neville Chamberlain, and the German ambassador, Joachim von Ribbentrop. Appalled by his godfather's role in seeking appeasement for Nazi Germany, Cardinal tells Stevens that Darlington is being used by the Nazis, but Stevens feels it is not his place to judge his employer.

Kenton forms a relationship with former co-worker Tom Benn and accepts his proposal of marriage. She informs Stevens as an ultimatum, but he will not admit his feelings and only offers his congratulations. Finding her crying, his only response is to call her attention to a neglected domestic task, and she leaves Darlington Hall before the start of the Second World War.

En route to meeting Kenton in 1958, Stevens is mistaken for a gentleman at a pub. Doctor Carlisle, a local GP, helps him refuel the Daimler, deduces that he is actually a manservant, and asks his thoughts about Lord Darlington's actions. Initially denying having even met him, Stevens later admits to having served and respected him, noting that Darlington later confessed that his Nazi sympathies had been misguided and naive. Stevens tells Carlisle that, although Lord Darlington was unable to correct his error, he is attempting to correct his own.

Stevens meets Kenton, who has separated from her husband and is staying at a boarding house on the coast. She and Stevens discuss how Lord Darlington died from a broken heart after suing a newspaper for libel, losing the suit and his reputation. Stevens mentions that Cardinal was killed in the war. Kenton declines to resume her position at Darlington Hall, wishing to remain near her pregnant daughter and, despite years of unhappiness, thinking about going back to her husband. Stevens supposes they may never meet again, and they part fondly but are both quietly upset, with Kenton visibly tearful as her bus pulls away.

Stevens returns to Darlington Hall, where Lewis asks whether he remembers what he had said at the conference in the 30s. Stevens replies that he was too busy serving to listen to the speeches. A pigeon flies into the fireplace from the chimney, and Lewis catches and sets it free. Stevens watches the bird as it flies away, leaving Darlington Hall far behind.

== Cast ==
- Anthony Hopkins as Mr James Stevens
- Emma Thompson as Miss Sarah "Sally" Kenton (later Mrs Benn)
- James Fox as the Earl of Darlington (Lord Darlington)
- Christopher Reeve as Congressman Jack Lewis
- Peter Vaughan as Mr William Stevens ("Mr Stevens, Sr")
- Hugh Grant as Reginald Cardinal (Lord Darlington's godson)
- Tim Pigott-Smith as Mr Tom Benn
- John Haycraft as Auctioneer
- Paul Copley as Harry Smith
- Michael Lonsdale as Dupont d'Ivry
- Brigitte Kahn as Baroness
- Jeffry Wickham as Viscount Bigge
- Paula Jacobs as Mrs Mortimer
- Ben Chaplin as Charlie
- Rupert Vansittart as Sir Geoffrey Wren
- Patrick Godfrey as Spencer
- Peter Halliday as Canon Tufnell
- Peter Cellier as Sir Leonard Bax
- Pip Torrens as Doctor Carlisle
- Frank Shelley as Prime Minister Neville Chamberlain
- Peter Eyre as the 3rd Viscount Halifax (Lord Halifax)
- Wolf Kahler as Joachim von Ribbentrop
- Lena Headey as Lizzie
- John Savident as Doctor Meredith

== Production ==
A film adaptation of the novel was originally planned at Columbia to be directed by Mike Nichols from a script by Harold Pinter with a projected budget of $26 million. Meryl Streep’s then-agent, Sam Cohn, and the director sold her on the plum role of Miss Kenton. Both Streep and Jeremy Irons read for Nichols, but the filmmaker opted not to cast them in roles later filled by Emma Thompson (ten years Meryl's junior) and Anthony Hopkins (twenty years Emma's senior). Cohn, who was also Nichols's agent, didn’t make it clear to Meryl that she was no longer a candidate for Miss Kenton; she learned only later, after reading about Thompson's casting. Shortly thereafter Streep made headlines after she fired her long time, east coast agent, signing with rival agent Bryan Lourd at the powerful Creative Artists Agency. James Ivory had taken an interest in the book and with his producing partner Ismail Merchant, they planned to make the film for $11.5 million. Some of Pinter's script was used in the film, but, while Pinter was paid for his work, he asked to have his name removed from the credits, in keeping with his contract. (Note: "In November 1994, Pinter wrote, "I've just heard that they are bringing another writer into the "Lolita" film. It doesn't surprise me.' ... Pinter's contract contained a clause to the effect that the film company could bring in another writer, but that in such a case he could withdraw his name (which is exactly the case with [the film] The Remains of the Day—he had insisted on this clause since the bad experience with revisions made to his Handmaid's Tale script); he has never been given any reason as to why another writer was brought in" (Gale 352).) Christopher C. Hudgins observes: "During our 1994 interview, Pinter told [Steven H.] Gale and me that he had learned his lesson after the revisions imposed on his script for The Handmaid's Tale, which he has decided not to publish. When his script for The Remains of the Day was radically revised by the James Ivory–Ismail Merchant partnership, he refused to allow his name to be listed in the credits" (125). (Note: Hudgins adds: "We did not see Pinter's name up in lights when Lyne's Lolita finally made its appearance in 1998. Pinter goes on in the March 13 [1995] letter [to Hudgins] to state that 'I have never been given any reason at all as to why the film company brought in another writer,' again quite similar to the equally ungracious treatment that he received in the Remains of the Day situation" (125).) (Note: Cf. the essay on the film The Remains of the Day published in Gale's collection by Edward T. Jones: "Pinter gave me a copy of his typescript for his screenplay, which he revised 24 January 1991, during an interview that I conducted with him in London about his screenplay in May 1992, part of which appeared in 'Harold Pinter: A Conversation' in Literature/Film Quarterly, XXI (1993): 2–9. In that interview, Pinter mentioned that Ishiguro liked the screenplay that he had scripted for a proposed film version of the novel. All references to Pinter's screenplay in the text [of Jones's essay] are to this unpublished manuscript" (107n1).) (Note: In his 2008 essay published in The Pinter Review, Hudgins discusses further details about why "Pinter elected not to publish three of his completed film scripts, The Handmaid's Tale, The Remains of the Day and Lolita," all of which Hudgins considers "masterful film scripts" of "demonstrable superiority to the shooting scripts that were eventually used to make the films"; fortunately ("We can thank our various lucky stars"), he says, "these Pinter film scripts are now available not only in private collections but also in the Pinter Archive at the British Library"; in this essay, which he first presented as a paper at the 10th Europe Theatre Prize symposium, Pinter: Passion, Poetry, Politics, held in Turin, Italy, in March 2006, Hudgins "examin[es] all three unpublished film scripts in conjunction with one another" and "provides several interesting insights about Pinter's adaptation process" (132).) Though no longer the director, Nichols remained associated with the project as one of its producers.

The music was recorded at Windmill Lane Studios in Dublin.

=== Settings ===
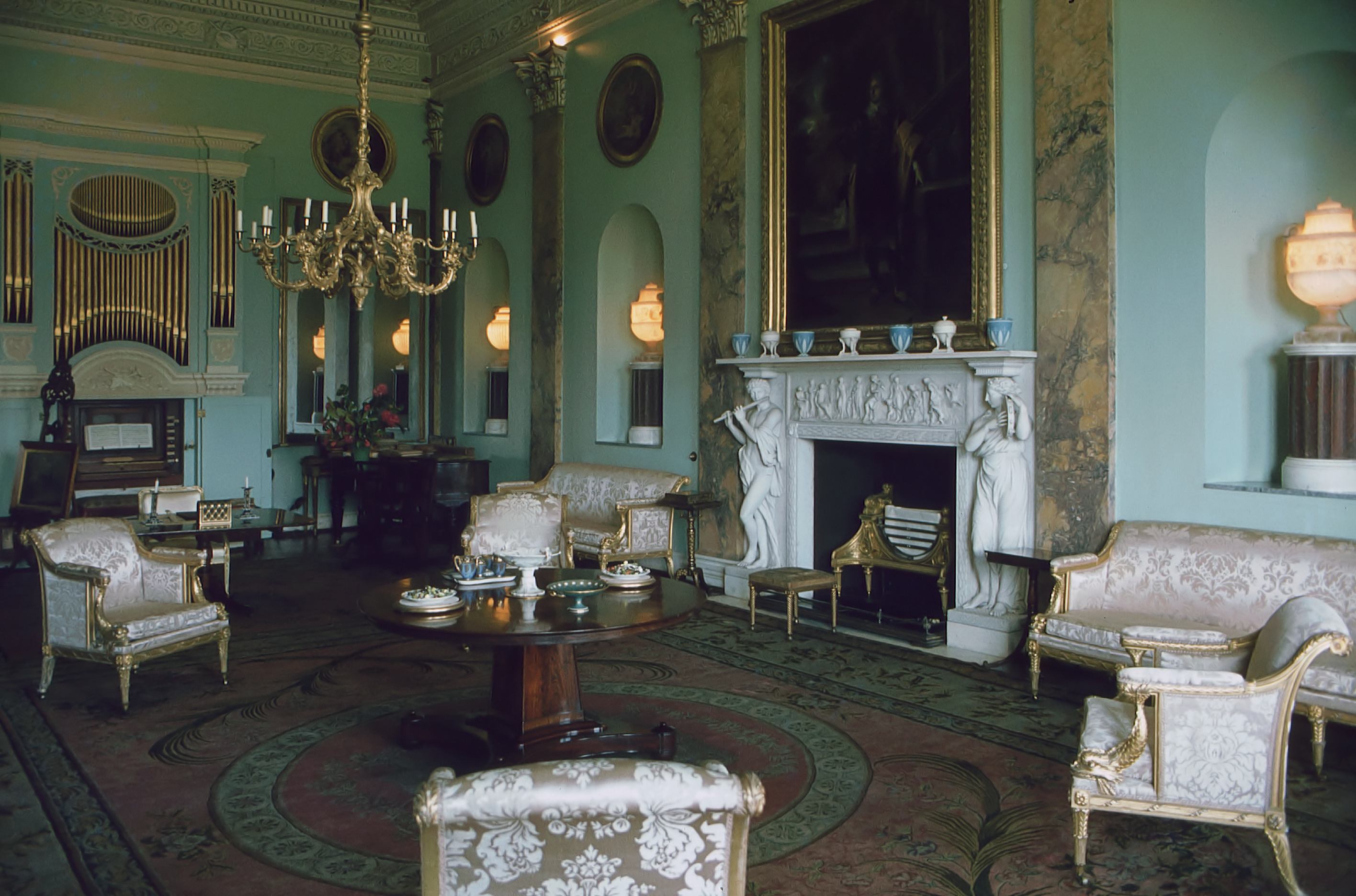
Music room of Powderham Castle in 1983

A number of English country estates were used as locations for the film, partly owing to the persuasive power of Ismail Merchant, who was able to cajole permission for the production to borrow houses not normally open to the public. Among them were Dyrham Park for the exterior of the house and the driveway, Powderham Castle (staircase, hall, music room, bedroom; used for the aqua-turquoise stairway scenes), Corsham Court (library and dining room) and Badminton House (servants' quarters, conservatory, entrance hall). Luciana Arrighi, the production designer, scouted most of these locations. Scenes were also shot in Weston-super-Mare, which stood in for Clevedon. The pub where Mr Stevens stays is the Hop Pole in Limpley Stoke; the shop featured is also in Limpley Stoke. The pub where Miss Kenton and Mr Benn meet is The George Inn in Norton St Philip.

=== Characters ===
The character of Sir Geoffrey Wren is based loosely on that of Sir Oswald Mosley, a British fascist active in the 1930s. Wren is depicted as a strict vegetarian, like Hitler. The 3rd Viscount Halifax (later created the 1st Earl of Halifax) also appears in the film. Lord Darlington tells Stevens that Halifax approved of the polish on the silver, and Lord Halifax himself later appears when Darlington meets secretly with the German Ambassador and his aides at night. Halifax was the chief architect of the British policy of appeasement from 1937 to 1939. Coincidentally, Halifax was born at Powderham Castle (above). The character of Congressman Jack Lewis in the film is a composite of two separate American characters in Kazuo Ishiguro's novel: Senator Lewis (who attends the pre-WW2 conference in Darlington Hall), and Mr Farraday, who succeeds Lord Darlington as master of Darlington Hall.

== Release ==
The film had its premiere on 25 October 1993 at the Academy of Motion Picture Arts and Sciences in Los Angeles.

It was the opening night film at the London Film Festival on 4 November 1993 and opened in 94 theatres in the United States on 5 November.

== Reception ==
=== Box office ===
The film grossed $23 million in the United States and Canada. In the United Kingdom, it grossed £4.5 million. Worldwide, it grossed a total of $63.9 million.

=== Critical reception ===
On Rotten Tomatoes the film has a 96% rating based on 49 reviews, with an average rating of 8.6/10. The consensus states: "Smart, elegant, and blessed with impeccable performances from Anthony Hopkins and Emma Thompson, The Remains of the Day is a Merchant–Ivory classic." On Metacritic, it has a weighted average score of 86 based on 12 reviews. Audiences polled by CinemaScore gave the film an average grade of "A−" on an A+ to F scale.

Roger Ebert particularly praised the film, calling it "a subtle, thoughtful movie." In his favorable review for The Washington Post, Desson Howe wrote, "Put Anthony Hopkins, Emma Thompson and James Fox together and you can expect sterling performances." Vincent Canby of The New York Times said, in another favorable review, "Here's a film for adults. It's also about time to recognize that Mr. Ivory is one of our finest directors, something that critics tend to overlook because most of his films have been literary adaptations."

The film was named one of the best films of 1993 by over 50 critics, making it the fifth-most-acclaimed film of 1993.

=== Accolades ===
Award	Category	Recipient(s)	Result
20/20 Awards	Best Actor	Anthony Hopkins	Nominated
20/20 Awards	Best Actress	Emma Thompson	Nominated
20/20 Awards	Best Adapted Screenplay	Ruth Prawer Jhabvala	Nominated
20/20 Awards	Best Costume Design	Jenny Beavan and John Bright	Nominated
20/20 Awards	Best Original Score	Richard Robbins	Nominated
Academy Awards	Best Picture	John Calley, Mike Nichols and Ismail Merchant	Nominated
Academy Awards	Best Director	James Ivory	Nominated
Academy Awards	Best Actor	Anthony Hopkins	Nominated
Academy Awards	Best Actress	Emma Thompson	Nominated
Academy Awards	Best Screenplay – Based on Material Previously Produced or Published	Ruth Prawer Jhabvala	Nominated
Academy Awards	Best Art Direction	Art Direction: Luciana Arrighi; Set Decoration: Ian Whittaker	Nominated
Academy Awards	Best Costume Design	Jenny Beavan and John Bright	Nominated
Academy Awards	Best Original Score	Richard Robbins	Nominated
Awards Circuit Community Awards	Best Actress in a Leading Role	Emma Thompson	Nominated
Awards Circuit Community Awards	Best Costume Design	Jenny Beavan and John Bright	Nominated
Awards Circuit Community Awards	Best Production Design	Luciana Arrighi and Ian Whittaker	Nominated
British Academy Film Awards	Best Film	Ismail Merchant, Mike Nichols, John Calley, and James Ivory	Nominated
British Academy Film Awards	Best Direction	James Ivory	Nominated
British Academy Film Awards	Best Actor in a Leading Role	Anthony Hopkins	Won
British Academy Film Awards	Best Actress in a Leading Role	Emma Thompson	Nominated
British Academy Film Awards	Best Adapted Screenplay	Ruth Prawer Jhabvala	Nominated
British Academy Film Awards	Best Cinematography	Tony Pierce-Roberts	Nominated
Chicago Film Critics Association Awards	Best Actor	Anthony Hopkins	Nominated
Chicago Film Critics Association Awards	Best Actress	Emma Thompson	Nominated
Chicago Film Critics Association Awards	Best Screenplay	Ruth Prawer Jhabvala	Nominated
Dallas–Fort Worth Film Critics Association Awards	Best Film		Nominated
Dallas–Fort Worth Film Critics Association Awards	Best Actor	Anthony Hopkins	Won
David di Donatello Awards	Best Foreign Film	James Ivory	Nominated
David di Donatello Awards	Best Foreign Actor	Anthony Hopkins	Won
David di Donatello Awards	Best Foreign Actress	Emma Thompson	Won
Directors Guild of America Awards	Outstanding Directorial Achievement in Motion Pictures	James Ivory	Nominated
Evening Standard British Film Awards	Best Actress	Emma Thompson (Also for Much Ado About Nothing)	Won
Golden Globe Awards	Best Motion Picture – Drama		Nominated
Golden Globe Awards	Best Actor in a Motion Picture – Drama	Anthony Hopkins	Nominated
Golden Globe Awards	Best Actress in a Motion Picture – Drama	Emma Thompson	Nominated
Golden Globe Awards	Best Director – Motion Picture	James Ivory	Nominated
Golden Globe Awards	Best Screenplay – Motion Picture	Ruth Prawer Jhabvala	Nominated
Goya Awards	Best European Film	James Ivory	Nominated
Kansas City Film Critics Circle Awards	Best Actor	Anthony Hopkins	Won
Kansas City Film Critics Circle Awards	Best Actress	Emma Thompson	Won
London Film Critics Circle Awards	British Film of the Year		Won
London Film Critics Circle Awards	Director of the Year	James Ivory	Won
London Film Critics Circle Awards	Actor of the Year	Anthony Hopkins	Won
Los Angeles Film Critics Association Awards	Best Actor	Anthony Hopkins (Also for Shadowlands)	Won
Movieguide Awards	Best Movie for Mature Audiences		Won
Nastro d'Argento	Best Foreign Director	James Ivory	Nominated
National Board of Review Awards	Top Ten Films		3rd Place
National Board of Review Awards	Best Actor	Anthony Hopkins (Also for Shadowlands)	Won
National Society of Film Critics Awards	Best Actor	Anthony Hopkins (Also for Shadowlands)	3rd Place
New York Film Critics Circle Awards	Best Actor	Anthony Hopkins (Also for Shadowlands)	Runner-up
New York Film Critics Circle Awards	Best Actress	Emma Thompson (Also for Much Ado About Nothing)	Runner-up
Producers Guild of America Awards	Outstanding Producer of Theatrical Motion Pictures	Mike Nichols, John Calley, and Ismail Merchant	Nominated
Robert Awards	Best Foreign Film	James Ivory	Won
Southeastern Film Critics Association Awards	Top Ten Films		3rd Place
Southeastern Film Critics Association Awards	Best Actor	Anthony Hopkins (Also for Shadowlands)	Won
Turkish Film Critics Association Awards	Best Foreign Film		7th Place
USC Scripter Awards		Ruth Prawer Jhabvala (screenwriter); Kazuo Ishiguro (author)	Nominated
Writers Guild of America Awards	Best Screenplay – Based on Material Previously Produced or Published	Ruth Prawer Jhabvala	Nominated

- The film is #64 at the British Film Institute's "Top 100 British films".
- The film was also nominated for the American Film Institute's "100 Years...100 Passions" list.

== Soundtrack ==
The Remains of the Day

Film score by Richard Robbins
- Released: 1993
- Length: 49:26

Professional ratings
Review scores
Source	Rating
Entertainment Weekly	A

The original score was composed by Richard Robbins. It was nominated for the Academy Award for Best Original Score, but lost to Schindler's List.

Track listing

1. Opening Titles, Darlington Hall – 7:27
2. The Keyhole and the Chinaman – 4:14
3. Tradition and Order – 1:51
4. The Conference Begins – 1:33
5. Sei Mir Gegrüsst (Schubert) – 4:13
6. The Cooks in the Kitchen – 1:34
7. Sir Geoffrey Wren and Stevens Sr. – 2:41
8. You Mean a Great Deal to This House – 2:21
9. Loss and Separation – 6:19
10. Blue Moon – 4:57
11. Sentimental Love Story/Appeasement/In the Rain – 5:22
12. A Portrait Returns/Darlington Hall/End Credits – 6:54

== See also ==
- BFI Top 100 British films
- Cliveden set

== Bibliography ==
- Gale, Steven H. Sharp Cut: Harold Pinter's Screenplays and the Artistic Process. Lexington, Ky.: The University Press of Kentucky, 2003.
- Gale, Steven H., ed. The Films of Harold Pinter. Albany: SUNY Press, 2001.
- Hudgins, Christopher C. "Harold Pinter's Lolita: 'My Sin, My Soul'." In The Films of Harold Pinter. Steven H. Gale, ed. Albany, N.Y.: SUNY Press, 2001.
- Hudgins, Christopher C. "Three Unpublished Harold Pinter Filmscripts: The Handmaid's Tale, The Remains of the Day, Lolita." The Pinter Review: Nobel Prize / Europe Theatre Prize Volume: 2005 – 2008. Francis Gillen with Steven H. Gale, eds. Tampa, Fla.: University of Tampa Press, 2008.
