= Side Streets (1998 film) =

British comedy-drama film

- Directed by: Tony Gerber
- Written by: Tony Gerber; Lynn Nottage
- Produced by: Bruce Weiss; Ismail Merchant (executive); Tom Borders (executive); Gregory Cascante (executive)
- Starring: Valeria Golino; Shashi Kapoor; Shabana Azmi; Miho Nikaido; Art Malik; Victor Argo; Rosario Dawson; Jennifer Esposito
- Cinematography: Russell Lee Fine
- Edited by: Kate Williams
- Music by: Evan Lurie
- Distributed by: Multicom Entertainment Group (via The Archive)
- Release dates: 6 September 1998 (Venice Film Festival); 25 April 1999 (UK)
- Running time: 130 min
- Country: United Kingdom
- Language: English

Side Streets is a 1998 comedy-drama film directed by Tony Gerber, about the intersecting lives of diverse people in New York City. It stars Valeria Golino, Shashi Kapoor, Shabana Azmi, Miho Nikaido, Art Malik, Victor Argo, Rosario Dawson, and Jennifer Esposito.

This movie has been distributed by Multicom Entertainment Group in some territories via The Archive, where it has been remastered in 4K.

== Cast ==
- Valeria Golino - Sylvie Otti
- Shashi Kapoor - Vikram Raj
- Shabana Azmi - Mrs. Chandra Bipin Raj
- Miho Nikaido - Yuki Shimamura
- David Vadim - Josif Iscovescu
- Art Malik - Bipin Raj
- Leon - Errol Boyce
- Joanna P. Adler - Policewoman Two
- Peter Appel - Boomir
- Victor Argo - Albani Krug
- Marie Barrientos - Lydia
- Kalimi Baxter - Maggie
- Gregg Bello - Jimi
- Helene Cara - Mrs. Petrescu
- Kathleen Chalfant - Nanda
- Oscar A. Colon - Mr. Hidalgo
- Rosario Dawson - Marisol Hidalgo
- Marina Durell - Mrs. Hidalgo
- Aunjanue Ellis - Brenda Boyce
- Jennifer Esposito - Jessica
- Venida Evans - Lydia Moulet
- Dudley Findlay Jr. - Sinclair
- Mtume Gant - Night Watchman
- Neil Harris - Night Watchman
- Mirjana Joković - Elena Iscovescu
- Jake-Ann Jones - Nicole
- Peter Lewis - Waiter
- Domenick Lombardozzi - Policeman One
- Mark Margolis - Bartender
- Laurence Mason - Dennis
- Peter McRobbie - Stelu
- David Moscow - Bellboy
- John Ortiz - Ramon Yanes
- Imani Parks - Girl in Botanica
- Gary Perez - Victor
- Joselin Reyes - Last Year's Miss Colita
- Michael Rogers - Larry
- Slava Schoot - Russian Thug
- Rob Sedgwick - Frank
- Bina Sharif - Vikram's Fan One
- Samia Shoaib - Dancing Party Guest
- Damon Taylor - Hotel Clerk
- Marc Tissot - Manuel
- Leonid Uscher-Citer - Boris
