= The Bostonians (film) =

1984 film based on the novel by Henry James

- Australian theatrical poster
- Directed by: James Ivory
- Screenplay by: Ruth Prawer Jhabvala
- Based on: The Bostonians by Henry James
- Produced by: Ismail Merchant
- Starring: Christopher Reeve; Vanessa Redgrave; Madeleine Potter; Jessica Tandy; Nancy Marchand; Wesley Addy
- Cinematography: Walter Lassally
- Edited by: Katherine Wenning
- Music by: Richard Robbins
- Production company: Merchant Ivory Productions
- Distributed by: Almi Pictures (USA)
- Release date: 2 August 1984 (United States)
- Running time: 122 minutes
- Countries: United Kingdom; United States
- Language: English
- Box office: $1,009,700

The Bostonians is a 1984 historical romance drama film directed by James Ivory. The screenplay by Ruth Prawer Jhabvala is based on the 1886 American novel The Bostonians by Henry James. The film stars Vanessa Redgrave, Christopher Reeve, Madeleine Potter, and Jessica Tandy.

The Bostonians was released in the United States on 2 August 1984. The film received respectable reviews and nominations by the Golden Globe Awards, Academy Awards, British Academy Film Awards, and won Golden Peacock (Best Film) at the 10th International Film Festival of India.

== Plot ==
Olive Chancellor, a Back Bay Boston spinster and leader of the women's suffrage movement, becomes enamored of Verena Tarrant, an inspirational young speaker, and adopts Verena as her protégée, her friend, and her companion. When Olive's distant relation, the chauvinist Southern lawyer Basil Ransom, falls in love with Verena and wishes to marry her — to relegate the young woman to the kitchen and the nursery — Olive and Ransom find themselves competing for Verena's affections. The charismatic Miss Tarrant must then choose whether to get herself to the nunnery of Olive's social cause or submit to the sensual but subservient life promised by Ransom.

== Cast ==
- Christopher Reeve as Basil Ransom
- Vanessa Redgrave as Olive Chancellor
- Madeleine Potter as Verena Tarrant
- Jessica Tandy as Miss Birdseye
- Nancy Marchand as Mrs. Burrage
- Wesley Addy as Dr. Tarrant
- Barbara Bryne as Mrs. Tarrant
- Linda Hunt as Dr. Prance
- Charles McCaughan as Music Hall Police Officer
- Nancy New as Adeline
- John Van Ness Philip as Henry Burrage
- Wallace Shawn as Mr. Pardon

== Production ==
Locations where the film was shot include:

- The Library of the Boston Athenaeum
- Gibson House Museum
- Beacon Hill, Boston
- Harvard University
- Chateau-sur-Mer, Newport, Rhode Island
- Troy Savings Bank Music Hall
- Central Park (including Belvedere Castle), New York City
- Martha's Vineyard

The film was partly financed by the Rank Organisation who had invested in Heat and Dust.

== Critical reception ==
On Rotten Tomatoes, the film has an 81% approval rating, based on 16 reviews, with an average rating of 6.90/10. On Metacritic, The Bostonians has a score of 59 out of a 100, based on 10 critics, indicating "mixed or average reviews".

Roger Ebert praised the film, giving it 3 out of 4 stars and observing:

Intelligent and subtle and open to the underlying tragedy of a woman who does not know what she wants, a man who does not care what he wants, and a girl who does not need what she wants.

== Accolades ==
| Award | Category | Nominee(s) | Result | Ref. |
|---|---|---|---|---|
| Academy Awards | Best Actress | Vanessa Redgrave | Nominated | |
| Academy Awards | Best Costume Design | Jenny Beavan and John Bright | Nominated | |
| British Academy Film Awards | Best Costume Design | Jenny Beavan and John Bright | Nominated | |
| British Society of Cinematographers Awards | Best Cinematography in a Theatrical Feature Film | Walter Lassally | Nominated | |
| Golden Globe Awards | Best Actress in a Motion Picture – Drama | Vanessa Redgrave | Nominated | |
| Los Angeles Film Critics Association Awards | Best Actress | Vanessa Redgrave | Runner-up | |
| National Society of Film Critics Awards | Best Actress | Vanessa Redgrave | Won | |
| New York Film Critics Circle Awards | Best Actress | Vanessa Redgrave | Runner-up | |
