= My Little Girl (film) =

1986 film directed by Connie Kaiserman

- Film poster
- Directed by: Connie Kaiserman
- Written by: Connie Kaiserman; Nan Mason
- Starring: Mary Stuart Masterson; James Earl Jones; Geraldine Page
- Cinematography: Pierre Lhomme
- Edited by: Katherine Wenning
- Music by: Richard Robbins
- Distributed by: Hemdale Film Corporation
- Release date: August 31, 1986; (Montréal World Film Festival)
- Running time: 118 minutes
- Country: United States
- Language: English
- Box office: $25,000

My Little Girl is a 1986 American drama film. The directorial debut of Connie Kaiserman, the film was released in the United States in 1987. It is also Geraldine Page's final role and both Jennifer Lopez and Erika Alexander's film debut.

== Plot ==
Franny Bettinger has had a privileged and wealthy upbringing. One summer, she takes a job at a children's and teen's detention center where she finds herself personally affected by the people she meets. Despite facing hostility due to her background, Bettinger becomes determined to teach the youngsters that they are important and can succeed in life. However, she faces opposition from her parents and from her supervisor.

== Cast ==
- Mary Stuart Masterson as Franny Bettinger
- James Earl Jones as Mr. Bailey
- Geraldine Page as Molly
- Anne Meara as Mrs. Shopper
- Pamela Payton-Wright as Delly Bettinger
- Peter Michael Goetz as Norman Bettinger
- Jennifer Lopez as Myra
- Erika Alexander as Joan
- Abeni Garrett as Ginger

== Release ==
My Little Girl was released on DVD and Blu-ray.

== Awards ==
Award	Year	Category	Category / Recipient	Result
Sundance Film Festival	1987	Grand Jury Prize	Dramatic Film / Connie Kaiserman	Nominated
