= Heat and Dust (film) =

- Theatrical release poster by Drew Struzan
- Directed by: James Ivory
- Screenplay by: Ruth Prawer Jhabvala
- Based on: Heat and Dust by Ruth Prawer Jhabvala
- Produced by: Ismail Merchant
- Starring: Greta Scacchi; Shashi Kapoor; Julie Christie; Zakir Hussain
- Cinematography: Walter Lassally
- Edited by: Humphrey Dixon
- Music by: Richard Robbins; Zakir Hussain
- Production company: Merchant Ivory Productions
- Distributed by: Curzon Film Distributors
- Release date: 1 January 1983
- Running time: 130 minutes
- Country: United Kingdom
- Languages: English; Urdu; Hindi
- Budget: £2.2 million or £1.1 million
- Box office: $2.6 million (overseas est.)

Heat and Dust is a 1983 British historical romantic drama film, with a screenplay by Ruth Prawer Jhabvala based on her novel, Heat and Dust (1975). It was directed by James Ivory and produced by Ismail Merchant. It stars Greta Scacchi, Shashi Kapoor and Julie Christie.

The plot of Heat and Dust follows two intertwined stories. The first is set in British India of the 1920s, and deals with an illicit affair between Olivia, the beautiful young wife of a British colonial official, and an Indian Nawab. The second, set in 1982, deals with Anne, Olivia's great-niece, who travels to India hoping to find out about her great-aunt's life, and while there, also has an affair with a married Indian man.

Heat and Dust was one of several film and television productions that emerged during the first half of the 1980s, reflecting Britain's growing interest in the British Raj. These included the films Gandhi (1982) and A Passage to India (1984), and the television series The Jewel in the Crown (1984) and The Far Pavilions (1984). Heat and Dust was nominated for the Palme d'Or at the 1983 Cannes Film Festival. At the 1984 BAFTA Awards, it earned eight nominations, including Best Film, and won Best Adapted Screenplay for Ruth Prawer Jhabvala.

== Plot ==
In 1982, an Englishwoman named Anne (Julie Christie) begins an investigation into the fate of her great-aunt Olivia (Greta Scacchi), whose letters and the diary she has inherited. She interviews the elderly Harry Hamilton-Paul (Nickolas Grace), who in his youth was Olivia's close friend when they were both living in India.

Anne's search brings her to India, where the story of Olivia's life is told in flashbacks. In 1923, during the British Raj, Olivia, recently married to Douglas Rivers (Christopher Cazenove), a civil servant in the colonial administration, has come to join her husband in Satipur, in central India. Douglas is an attentive husband and the couple seems to be very much in love. When he insists that Olivia spend the summer in Simla to avoid the extreme heat, she refuses in order to remain with him. However, the conventional narrow society of the English memsahibs bores her. Mrs. Saunders (Jennifer Kendal), the morbid wife of the local doctor, warns Olivia that all Indian men are potential rapists. Mrs. Crawford (Susan Fleetwood), the Burra Memsahib, is kindly but equally conservative. The racist Doctor Saunders takes an instant dislike to Olivia. While Anglo-Indian society seems to have little to offer Olivia, she is slowly enthralled by India itself. The region is being ransacked by a group of sanguinary bandits, and intrigues are opposing the British community led by Major Minnies and Mr. Crawford against the ruler of the neighboring princely state, the Nawab of Khatm (Shashi Kapoor). The British suspect him of being in league with a gang of bandits, allowing them to operate with impunity in exchange for a share of their booty.

The Nawab, a romantic and decadent minor prince who combines British distinction with Indian pomp and ruthlessness, invites all the Anglo-Indian officials and their wives for a dinner party at his palace. At the dinner, Olivia attracts the attention of the Nawab. Harry Hamilton-Paul enjoys a close intimacy with the Nawab and is a permanent guest at the palace. With his good humor and charm, Harry serves as a sort of court jester and he is well-liked even by the chain-smoking and proud Begum Mussarat Jahan (Madhur Jaffrey), the Nawab's mother. In the midst of the intense summer heat, Harry falls ill and Olivia comes often to visit him at the Nawab's palace. The Nawab easily seduces Olivia and they engage in an illicit affair.

Following in Olivia’s footsteps, Anne comes to Satipur to live in the same surroundings that framed Olivia’s story more than fifty years earlier. She stays as the guest of an Indian family. The head of the household, Inder Lal (Zakir Hussain), is a polite civil servant who serves as her guide while she tries to get connected with the world that Olivia lived. Inder Lal is worried that their hitherto innocent relationship will be perceived as sexual. Lal is married with children and lives with his wife and his mother. Ritu, Lal's young wife, is an epileptic and he slowly, but surely, endears himself to Anne to whom he is attracted. Anne befriends Chid (Charles McCaughan), an American charlatan posing as a sanyasi and a would-be convert to Hindu mysticism. Chid tries to seduce Anne with his antics, but she firmly rebuffs his sexual advances while becoming closer to Inder Lal. Eventually, Anne invites Lal into her bed.

Things get complicated for Olivia when she gets pregnant. She informs Douglas and the Nawab about it. Both men welcome the news. Douglas, unaware of his wife's infidelity, wishes for a son as blond as he is. The Nawab does not doubt that he is the father and he is overjoyed. He is in the midst of being deposed by the British, and views having a mixed-race heir as the ultimate revenge. Suspecting that the Nawab is the child's father, Olivia has an abortion in secret with Harry and the Begum's help, pretending to have a miscarriage. However, Olivia continues bleeding and is admitted to the hospital, where Dr. Saunders immediately discovers her ruse. Olivia runs away from the hospital early in the morning, eloping with the Nawab to Kashmir. She leaves Douglas broken-hearted, though he eventually remarries.

Like Olivia, Anne gets pregnant and she also decides to get an abortion but backs down at the last minute. The Indian diet makes Chid fall sick and he returns to the United States. Anne also leaves behind the heat and dust of Satipur. She travels to the snowy mountains of Kashmir where Olivia spent her last years in solitude, seldom visited by the Nawab. Anne plans to bear her child in a hospital nearby.

== Cast ==
- Greta Scacchi as Olivia Rivers
- Shashi Kapoor as The Nawab
- Julie Christie as Anne
- Christopher Cazenove as Douglas Rivers, Assistant Collector
- Nickolas Grace as Harry Hamilton-Paul
- Zakir Hussain as Inder Lal, Anne's Landlord
- Julian Glover as Crawford, The District Collector
- Susan Fleetwood as Mrs. Crawford, The Burra Memsahib
- Patrick Godfrey as Dr. Saunders, Medical Officer
- Jennifer Kendal as Mrs. Joan Saunders
- Charles McCaughan as Chid
- Madhur Jaffrey as Begum Mussarat Jahan, The Nawab's Mother
- Barry Foster as Major Minnies, The Political Agent
- Ratna Pathak as Ritu, Inder Lal's Wife
- Tarla Mehta as Inder Lal's Mother
- Sajid Khan as Dacoit Chief
- Amanda Walker as Lady Mackleworth
- Praveen Paul as Maji, Midwife
- Jayant Kripalani as Dr. Gopal
- Sudha Chopra as Chief Princess
- Daniel Chatto as A Party Guest
- Geoff Heinrich
- Ishtiaq Khan
- Baba Ghaus
- Deep Bedi
- Leelabai

== Background ==
Heat and Dust is based on the novel written by Ruth Prawer Jhabvala, which won the Booker Prize in 1975. The screenplay for the film was written by the writer herself.

Jhabvala planned Heat and Dust while writing the screenplay for Autobiography of a Princess (1975), which had a similar theme. The novel was also influenced by E. M. Forster's A Passage to India (1924) which dealt with the English in India and the cultural factors that separate them from the country's natives.

Heat and Dust also borrows from Forster's own life in the construction of two characters: the Nawab and his English close friend Harry. They were inspired by Forster and his younger friend J. R. Ackerley. Both men were homosexual and wrote reminiscences about their time living in India. Ackerley, in Hindoo Holiday (1932), leaves an account of his experience as secretary to an Indian Maharajah in the city of Chhatarpur, while Forster's The Hill of Devi (1953) recounts his time as secretary of the Maharajah of Dewas, in central India. The character of the secretary appeared first as Cyril Sahib, the Maharajah's tutor in Autobiography of a Princess, and then as the gay house guest of the Nawab in Heat and Dust. The Maharajah, a Hindu prince, is transformed into the Muslim Nawab in Heat and Dust.

== Production ==
The novel was made into a film by Merchant Ivory Productions, an independent production company founded in 1961. They were for the most part produced by Ismail Merchant, directed by James Ivory, with scripts usually written by Ruth Prawer Jhabvala.

The idea of making the film came from Ismail Merchant who explained:

I wanted Heat and Dust not only to celebrate our twenty-one years together, but to unite all three of us again in India, as The Householder had- but with a much larger theme, and I hoped, with much more money. Ruth wrote the screenplay, and as usual, I submitted it to all the Hollywood studios, who politely—and not so politely declined—one executive wrote, saying, we are returning Ruth Jhabvala's Eat my Dust. We knew we must find our financing in Europe.

Merchant secured backing in England with a budget of £2.2 million, but halfway through the project some of the expected financings failed to materialize and the production ran out of money. The cast and crew continued working despite not being paid. Sir Jacob Rothschild, after watching some dailies, provided the money to complete the film. Finance came in part from the Rank Organisation who also invested in the team's subsequent The Bostonians.

== Reception ==
=== Box office ===
Heat and Dust was an art-house hit in Europe, particularly in England. By March 1983 the film had reached number four on the London box office charts, behind Gandhi, The Verdict, and An Officer and a Gentleman.

In the United States, the film grossed $1,761,291. It fared poorly in the United States, where it had distribution problems. As a whole, Heat and Dust was Merchant Ivory's biggest commercial success up to that date. In France, Heat and Dust sold 362,777 tickets, equivalent to an estimated box office gross revenue of approximately €979,498 ($845,966). Combined, the film grossed an estimated $2,607,257 overseas in the United States and France, not including the United Kingdom.

The film's success marked a turning point for the company, and heralded the success of its subsequent films A Room with a View (1985), Howards End (1992) and The Remains of the Day (1993).

=== Critical response ===
The film was entered into the 1983 Cannes Film Festival, in competition for the Palme d'Or. For her screenplay, Jhabvala received both Britain's National Film Critics Award (London Film Critics' Circle) and the British Academy of Film and Television Arts (BAFTA) Award for best screenplay.

The film garnered favourable critical reaction. Writing for The New York Times, Vincent Canby commented: "If the contemporary story is not as involving as that of Olivia and the Nawab, it's partly because the contemporary problems are far more prosaic. It's as if the passage of time that witnessed the independence of India and its partition, as well the introduction of jet travel for the budget-minded, had neutralized all possibility of heroic romance... Mr. Ivory and Mrs. Jhabvala have been working together so long that it's difficult for an outsider to know exactly who contributed what to any of their collaborations. Together, over the years, they have evolved a kind of ironic, civilized cinema that doesn't quite correspond to anyone else's. Of all their collaborations, none has been more graceful, funny, literate or entertaining than Heat and Dust".

In the words of influential film critic Roger Ebert: "Heat and Dust contains wonderful sights and sounds and textures. It is seductive, treating both of its love stories with seriousness; these are not romances, but decisions to dissent. It is fully at home in its times and places... And when it is over, we're a little surprised to find that it is angry, too. Angry that women of every class and every system, women British and Indian, Women of the 1920s and of the 1980s, are always just not quite the same caste as men".

In their film review, Frederic and Mary Ann Brussat wrote: "James Ivory directs Heat and Dust with a firm grasp of India past and present — especially the natives' responses to outsiders. Thanks to the finely etched character portraits of Greta Scacchi and Julie Christie, we open our eyes to the manifold mysteries of Indian life. Both as an exploration of romance and as a sensitive cross-cultural study, Heat and Dust weaves a magical spell".

Heat and Dust holds a 79% rating on Rotten Tomatoes based on fourteen reviews.

=== Awards ===
Year	Award	Category	Nominee(s)	Result	Ref.
1983	Cannes Film Festival	Palme d'Or	Heat and Dust	Nominated	
1984	London Film Critics' Circle	Screenwriter of the Year	Ruth Prawer Jhabvala	Won	
1984	37th British Academy Film Awards	Best Film	Ismail Merchant	Nominated	
1984	37th British Academy Film Awards	Best Direction	James Ivory	Nominated	
1984	37th British Academy Film Awards	Best Adapted Screenplay	Ruth Prawer Jhabvala	Won	
1984	37th British Academy Film Awards	Best Newcomer to Film	Greta Scacchi	Nominated	
1984	37th British Academy Film Awards	Best Cinematography	Walter Lassally	Nominated	
1984	37th British Academy Film Awards	Best Costume Design	Barbara Lane	Nominated	
1984	37th British Academy Film Awards	Best Makeup and Hair	Gordon Kay	Nominated	
1984	37th British Academy Film Awards	Best Production Design	Wilfred Shingleton	Nominated	

== Home media ==
In 2003, a special edition DVD of the film was released as part of The Criterion Collection. The special features include an audio commentary with producer Ismail Merchant and actors Greta Scacchi, and Nickolas Grace. There is also an on-camera interview with the Merchant Ivory team: Ismail Merchant, James Ivory, Ruth Prawer Jhabvala and composer Richard Robbins.

The DVD also includes Autobiography of a Princess (1975), a 55-minute film about Royal India starring James Mason and Madhur Jaffrey. It was directed by James Ivory and written by Ruth Prawer Jhabvala.
