= Heat and Dust =

1975 novel by Ruth Prawer Jhabvala

- First edition (UK)
- Author: Ruth Prawer Jhabvala
- Genre: Historical novel
- Publisher: John Murray (UK); Harper and Row (US)
- Publication date: 30 October 1975
- Media type: Print (hardback & paperback)
- Pages: 181
- ISBN: 0-7195-3401-1
- OCLC: 1930059
- Dewey Decimal: 823
- LC Class: PR9499.3.J5 H4

Heat and Dust is a 1975 novel by British-American writer Ruth Prawer Jhabvala. It was the recipient of the 1975 Booker Prize. The book was also ranked by The Telegraph in 2014 as one of the 10 all-time greatest Asian novels.

== Plot summary ==
The initial stages of the novel are told in the first person, from the narrative voice of a woman (who is not named) who travels to India, to find out more about her grandfather's first wife, Olivia. She has letters written by Olivia, and through reading these, and learning from her own experiences in India, she uncovers the truth about Olivia and her life during the British Raj in the 1920s.

Through the use of flashbacks, the reader experiences the story from Olivia's point of view. We discover that Olivia, who is married to an English civil servant, while seeming to be a proper Englishwoman, is actually smothered by the social restrictions and longs for excitement. She meets the Nawab, the ruler of small state, who charms her and gradually draws her into his life. Olivia is attracted to the Nawab's charisma, and he slowly gains control over her, as he does with other characters such as Harry. Harry, an Englishman who lives in the Nawab's palace, is often unwell due to the climate and food, and would like to return to England but cannot stand up to the Nawab.

Olivia becomes pregnant but does not know if the baby has been fathered by her husband or the Nawab, and decides out of fear to have an abortion. The local English doctor finds out and there is a scandal. Olivia flees to the Nawab, who sends her to live in a small town in the mountains. The novel ends with the present-day narrator becoming pregnant to her Indian neighbour, and deciding to go to the same town where Olivia lived out her remaining years.

== Awards ==
- 1975: Booker Prize

== Film ==
The novel was made into a film of the same name in 1983 by Merchant Ivory Productions. It was an award-winning film, with a screenplay by Ruth Prawer Jhabvala based upon her novel, directed by James Ivory and produced by Ismail Merchant.
