= The Householder (novel) =

1960 English-language novel by Ruth Prawer Jhabvala

- First UK edition
- Author: Ruth Prawer Jhabvala
- Subject: bildungsroman
- Genre: fiction
- Publisher: John Murray (UK); W.W. Norton (US)
- Publication date: 1960
- Publication place: India
- Pages: 191
- ISBN: 978-0393008517
- OCLC: 369105
- Preceded by: Esmond in India (1958)
- Followed by: Get Ready for Battle (1962)

The Householder is a 1960 novel by British-American Ruth Prawer Jhabvala. It follows a young man named Prem who has recently moved from the first stage of his life, a student, to the second stage of his life, a householder. The book is a bildungsroman, which is a story where the protagonist develops mind and character as he passes from childhood through various experiences usually through a spiritual crisis into maturity.

A film adaptation of The Householder was released in 1963, and Jhabvala started her career as a screenwriter by co-writing its screenplay with director James Ivory. It was also Ivory's directorial debut (not including documentary shorts) as well as his first collaboration with producer Ismail Merchant.

== Characters ==
- Prem
- Indu, Prem's Wife
- Prem's mother
- Mr. Khanna, the principal of the college where Prem works as a teacher
- Mrs. Khanna
- Mr. Chaddha, the history teacher
- Mr. Sohan Lal, the math teacher
- Raj, Prem's high school friend
- Hans Loewe, Kitty, and Mohammed, white people living in India and their servant
- Mr. Seigal, Prem's landlord
