= BAFTA Award for Best Adapted Screenplay =

British film industry award

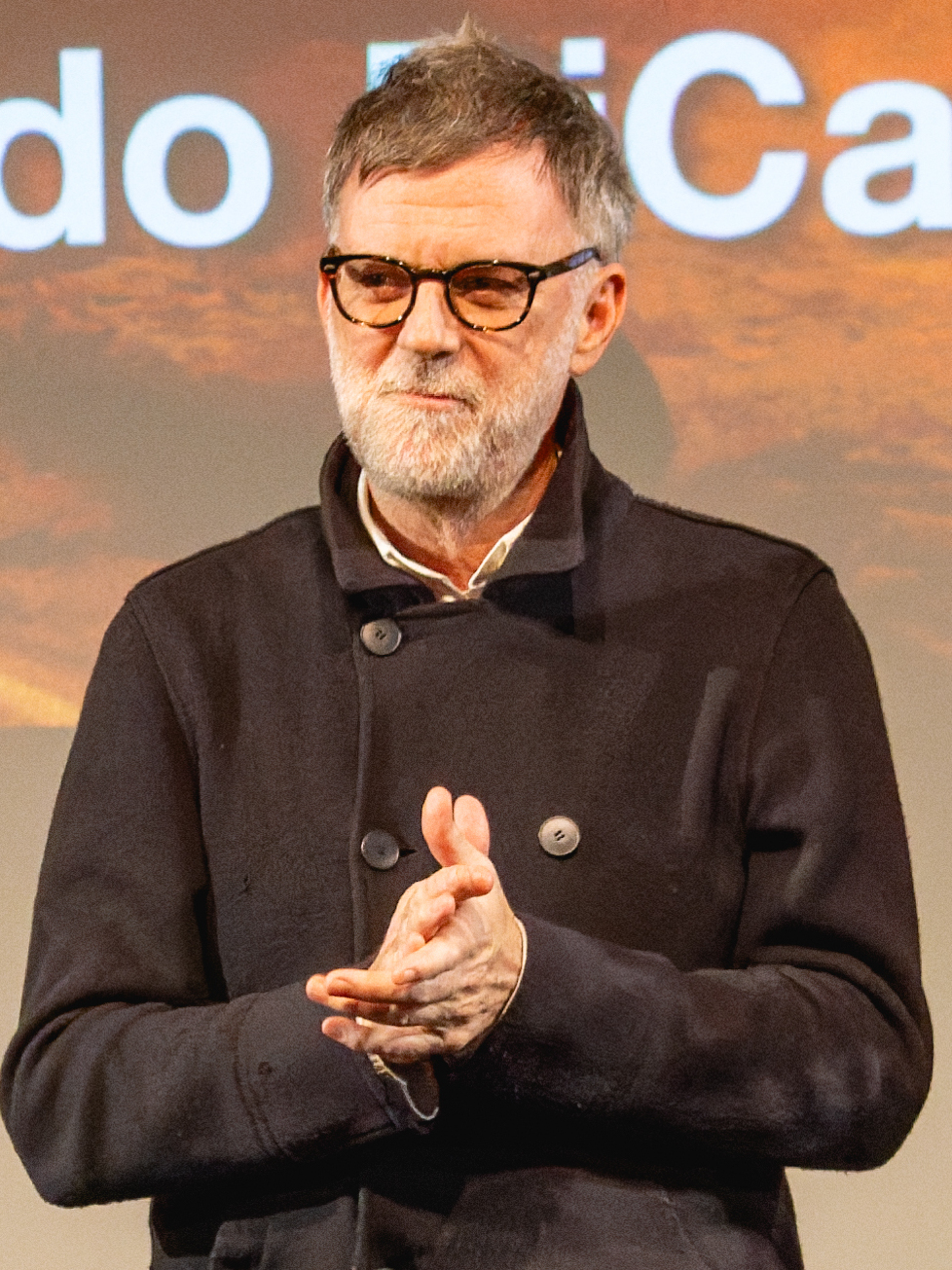
- The 2025 recipient: Paul Thomas Anderson
- Awarded for: Best Adapted Screenplay
- Location: United Kingdom
- Presented by: British Academy of Film and Television Arts
- Currently held by: Paul Thomas Anderson for One Battle After Another (2025)
- Website: http://www.bafta.org/

The BAFTA Award for Best Adapted Screenplay is a film award presented annually at the British Academy Film Awards to a screenwriter for a specific film. It is awarded by the British Academy of Film and Television Arts (BAFTA), a British organisation that hosts annual awards shows for film, television, and video games (and formerly also for children's film and television). Since 1983, selected films have been awarded with the BAFTA award for Best Adapted Screenplay at an annual ceremony.

In the following lists, the titles and names in bold with a gold background are the winners and recipients respectively; those not in bold are the remaining nominees. The winner is also the first name listed in each category.

== History ==
The British Academy of Film and Television Arts (BAFTA) award for Best Adapted Screenplay has been presented to its winners since 1968, when the original category (BAFTA Award for Best Screenplay) was split into two awards, the other being the BAFTA Award for Best Original Screenplay.

Christopher Hampton and Peter Straughan hold the record for the most wins in this category, with two each. Ronald Harwood, Ruth Prawer Jhabvala, Eric Roth and Aaron Sorkin tie for the most nominations in this category, with four each.

Shrek is the only animated feature to win in one of these two screenwriting categories.

== Winners and nominees ==
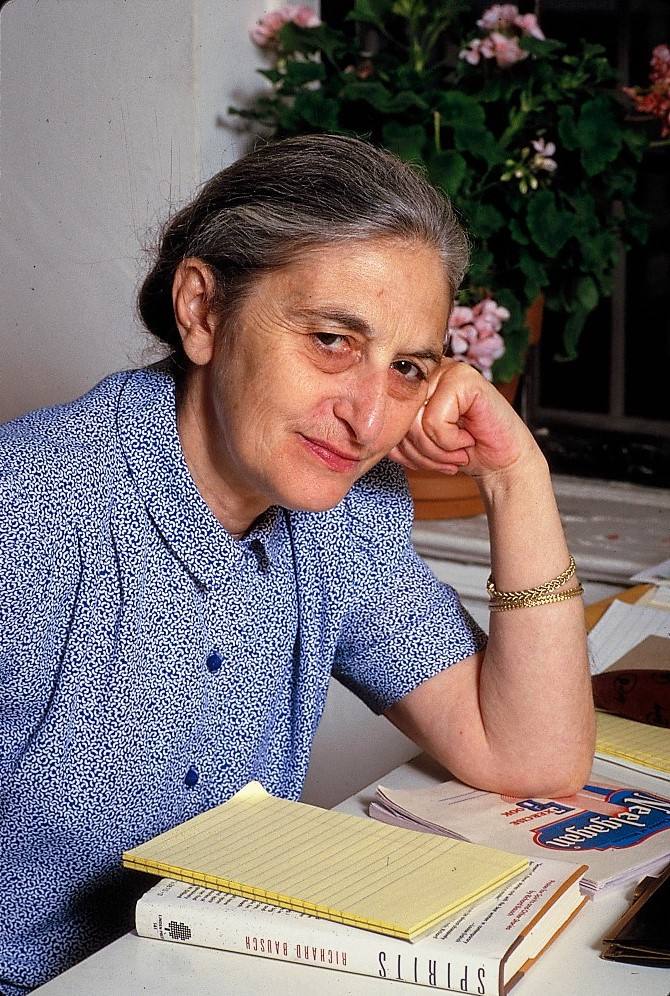
Ruth Prawer Jhabvala won for Heat and Dust (1983)

indicates the winner

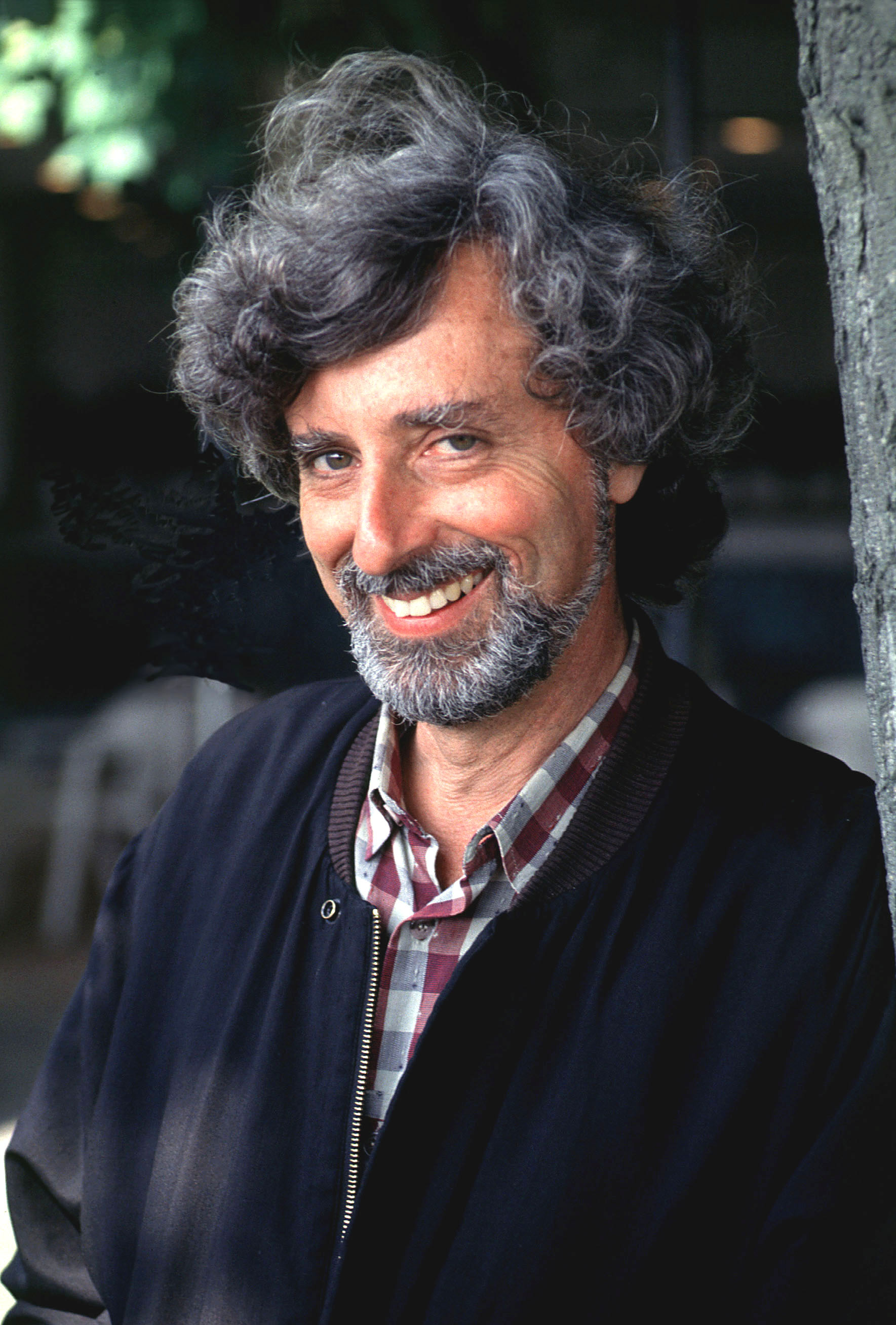
Philip Kaufman won The Unbearable Lightness of Being (1988)

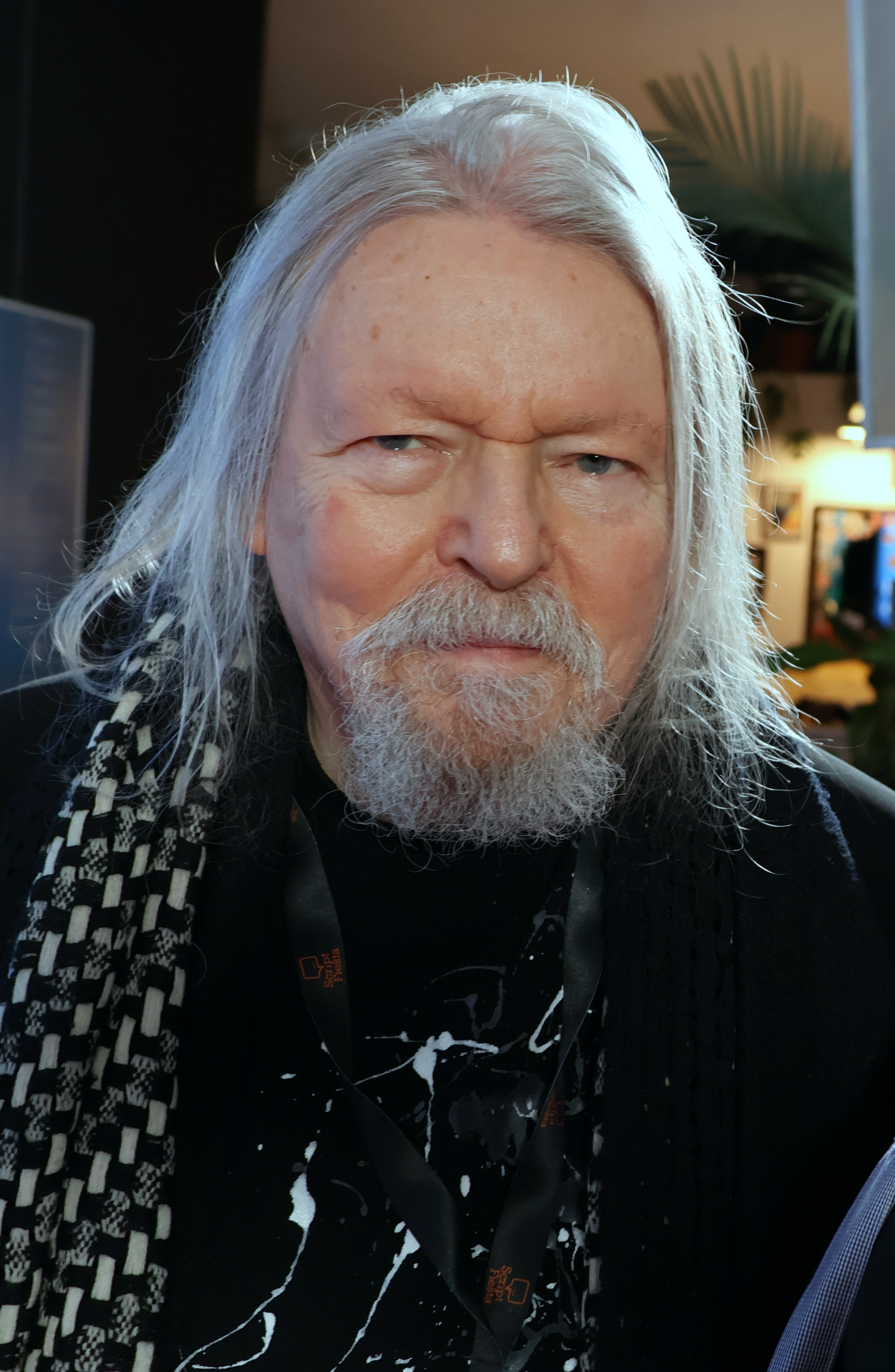
Christopher Hampton won twice for Dangerous Liaisons (1987) and The Father (2020)

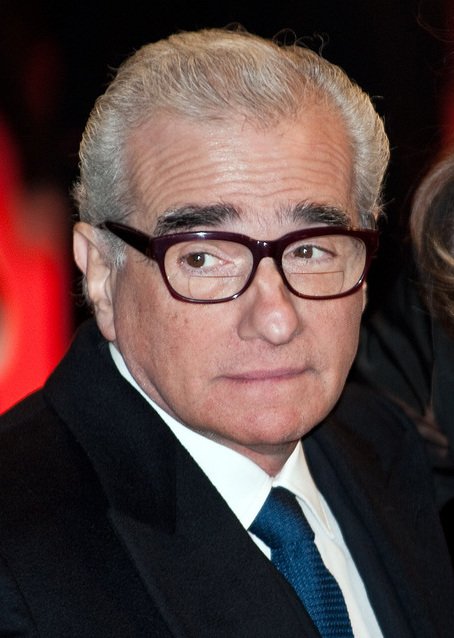
Martin Scorsese won for Goodfellas (1990)

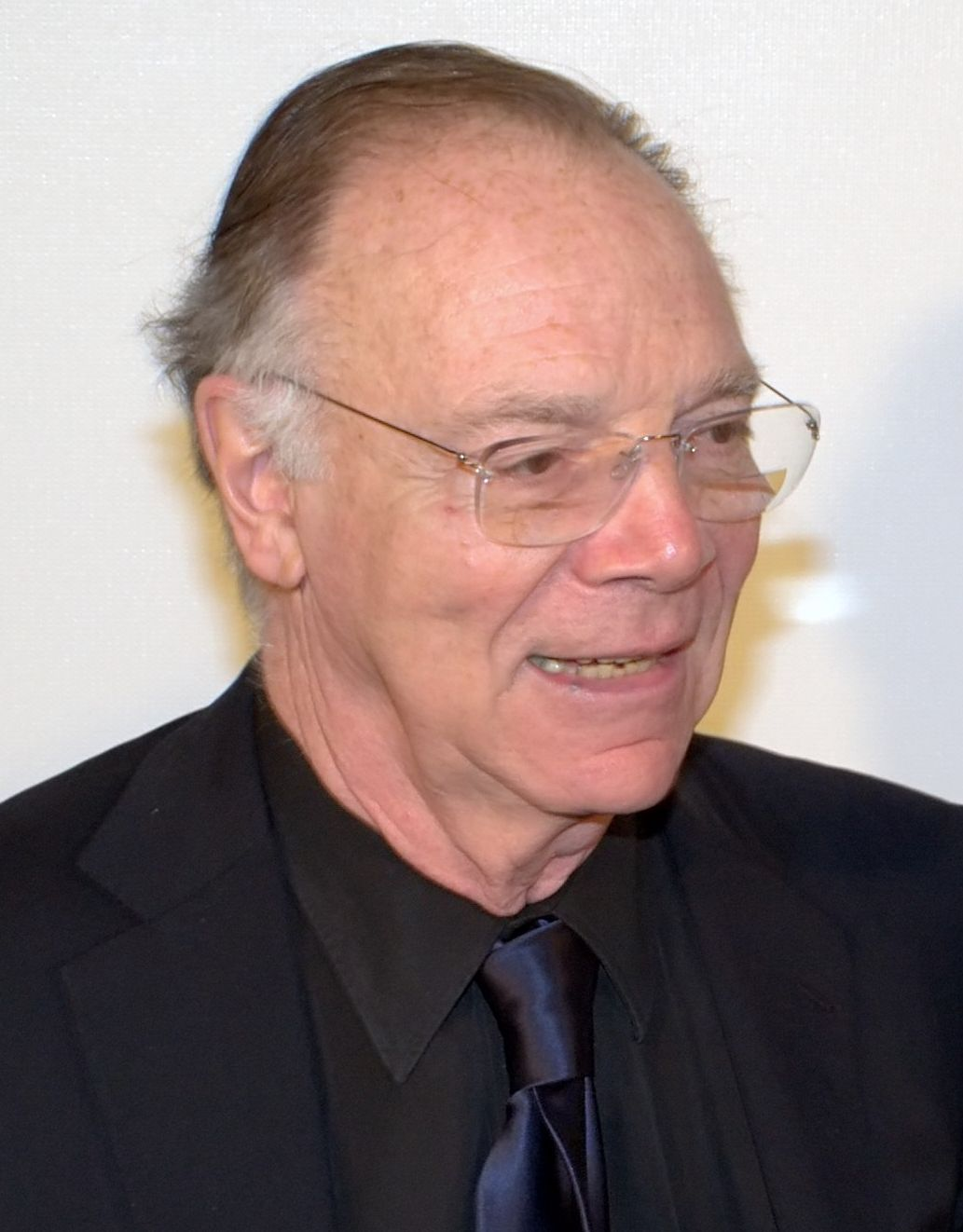
Nicholas Pileggi won for Goodfellas (1990)

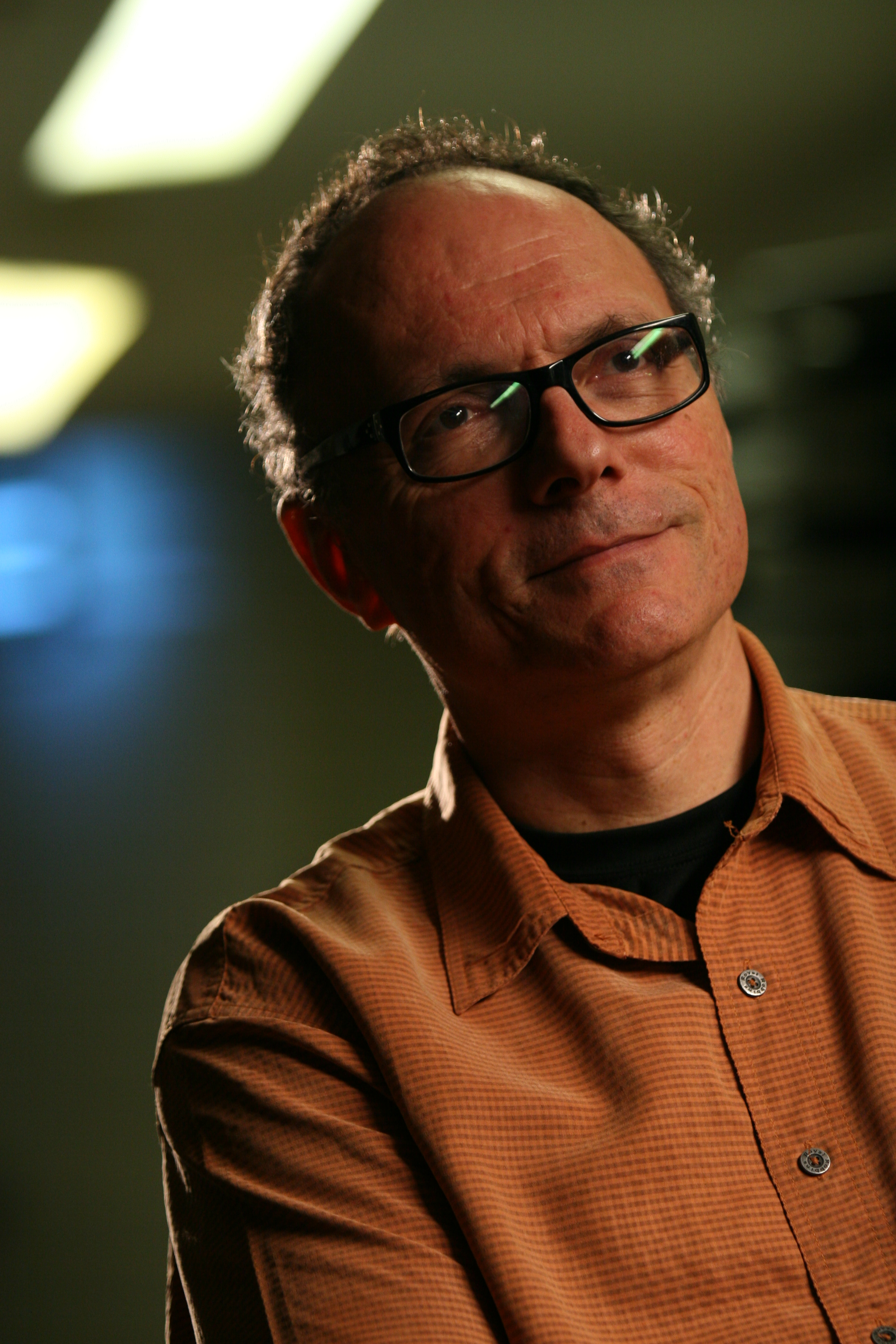
Michael Tolkin won for The Player (1992)

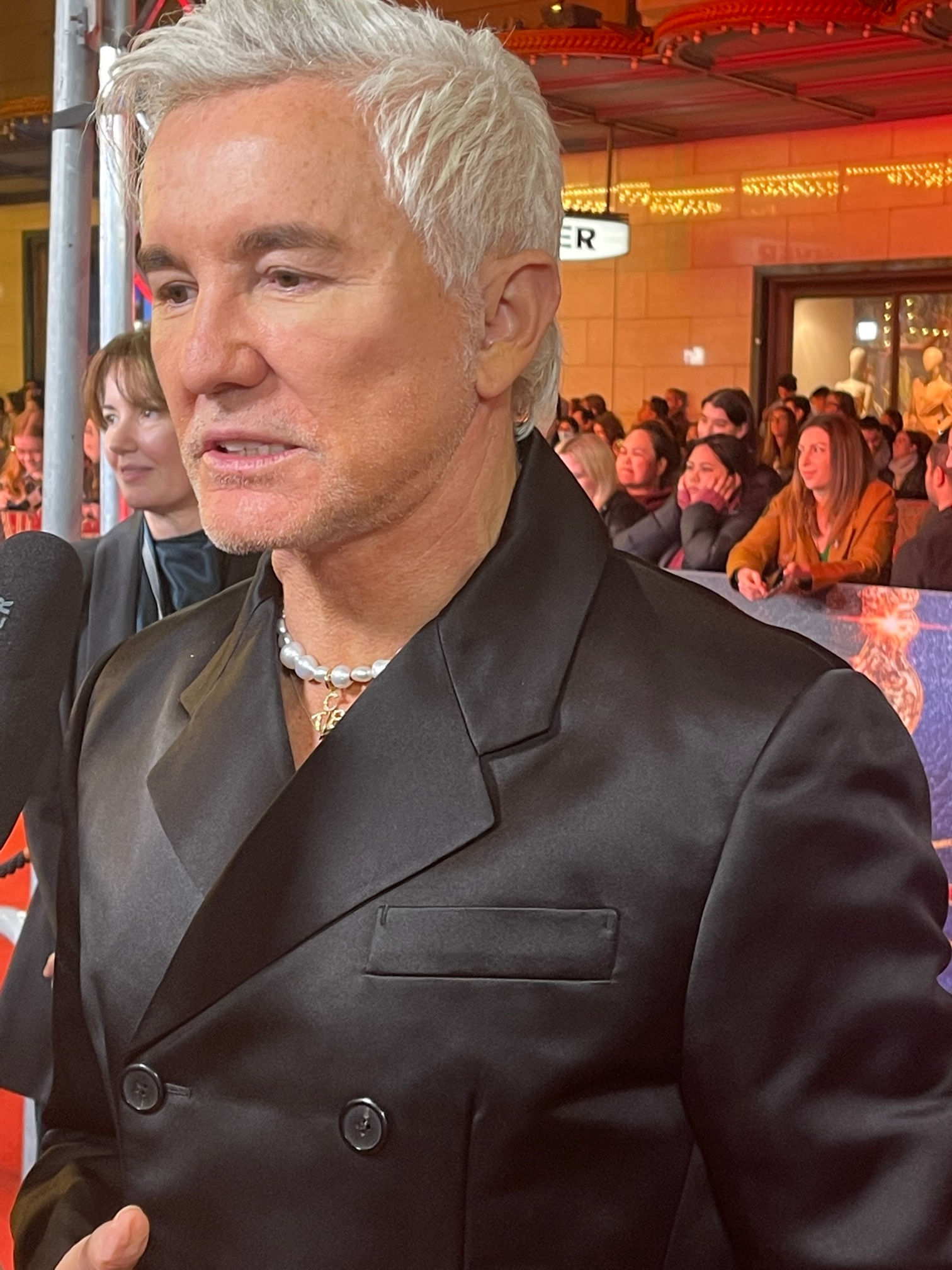
Baz Luhrmann won for Romeo + Juliet (1997)

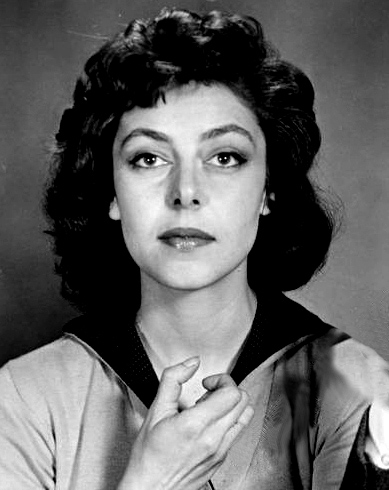
Elaine May won for Primary Colors (1998)

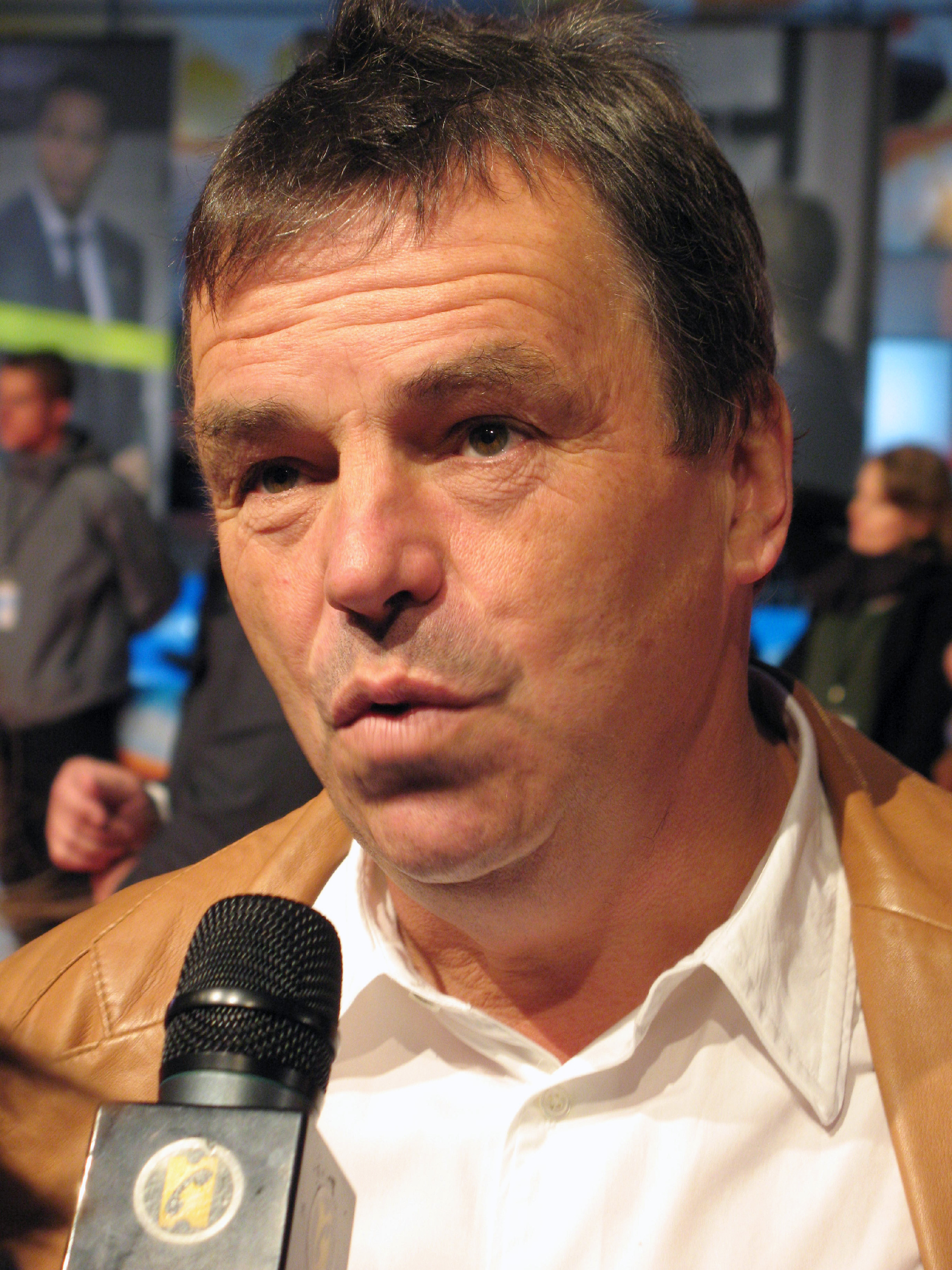
Neil Jordan won for The End of the Affair (1999)

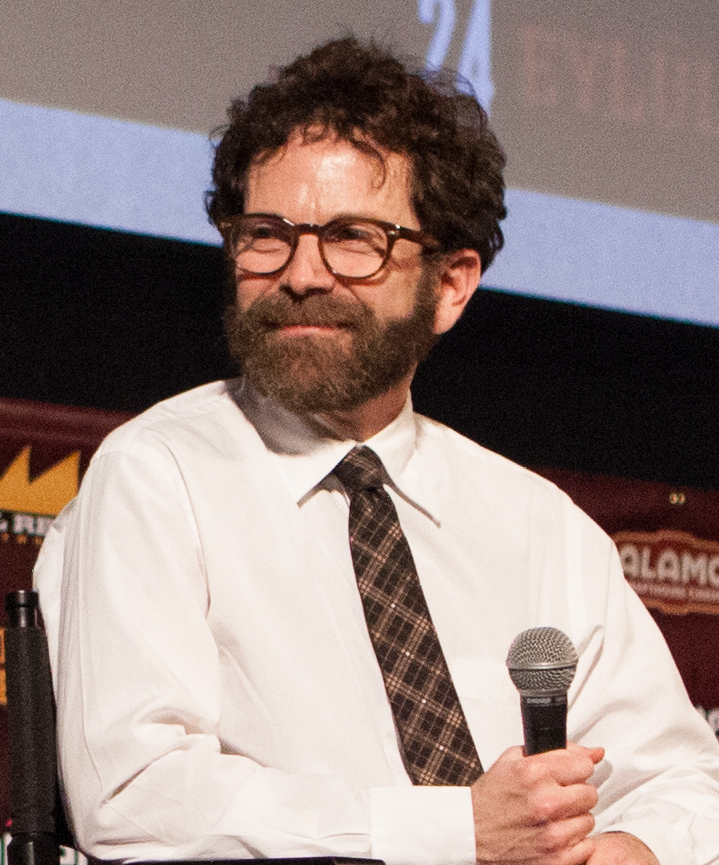
Charlie Kaufman won for Adaptation (2002)

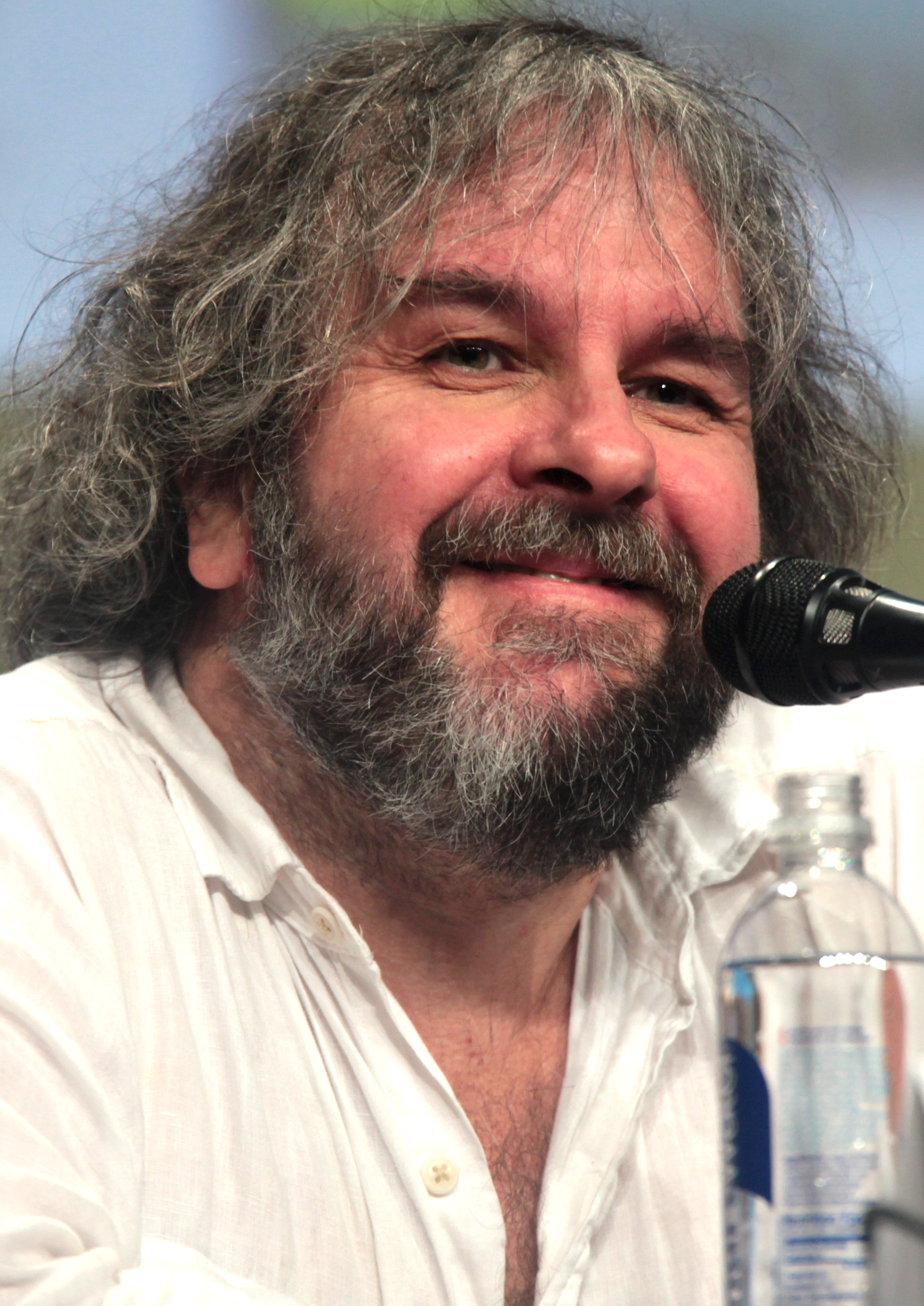
Peter Jackson won for The Lord of the Rings: The Return of the King (2003)

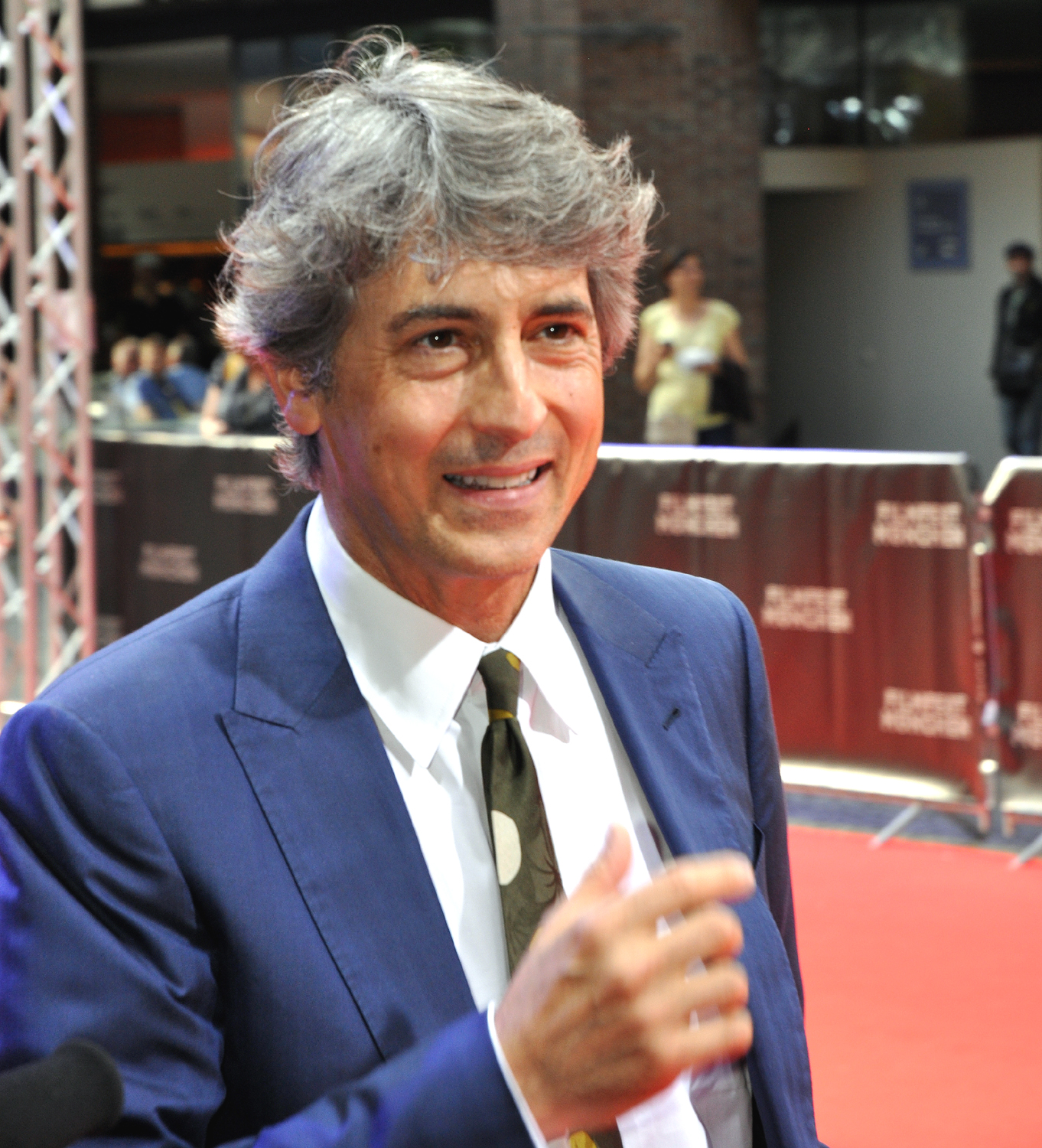
Alexander Payne won for Sideways (2004)

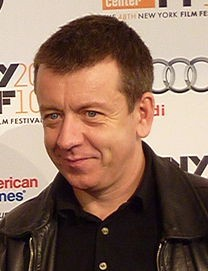
Peter Morgan won for The Last King of Scotland (2005)

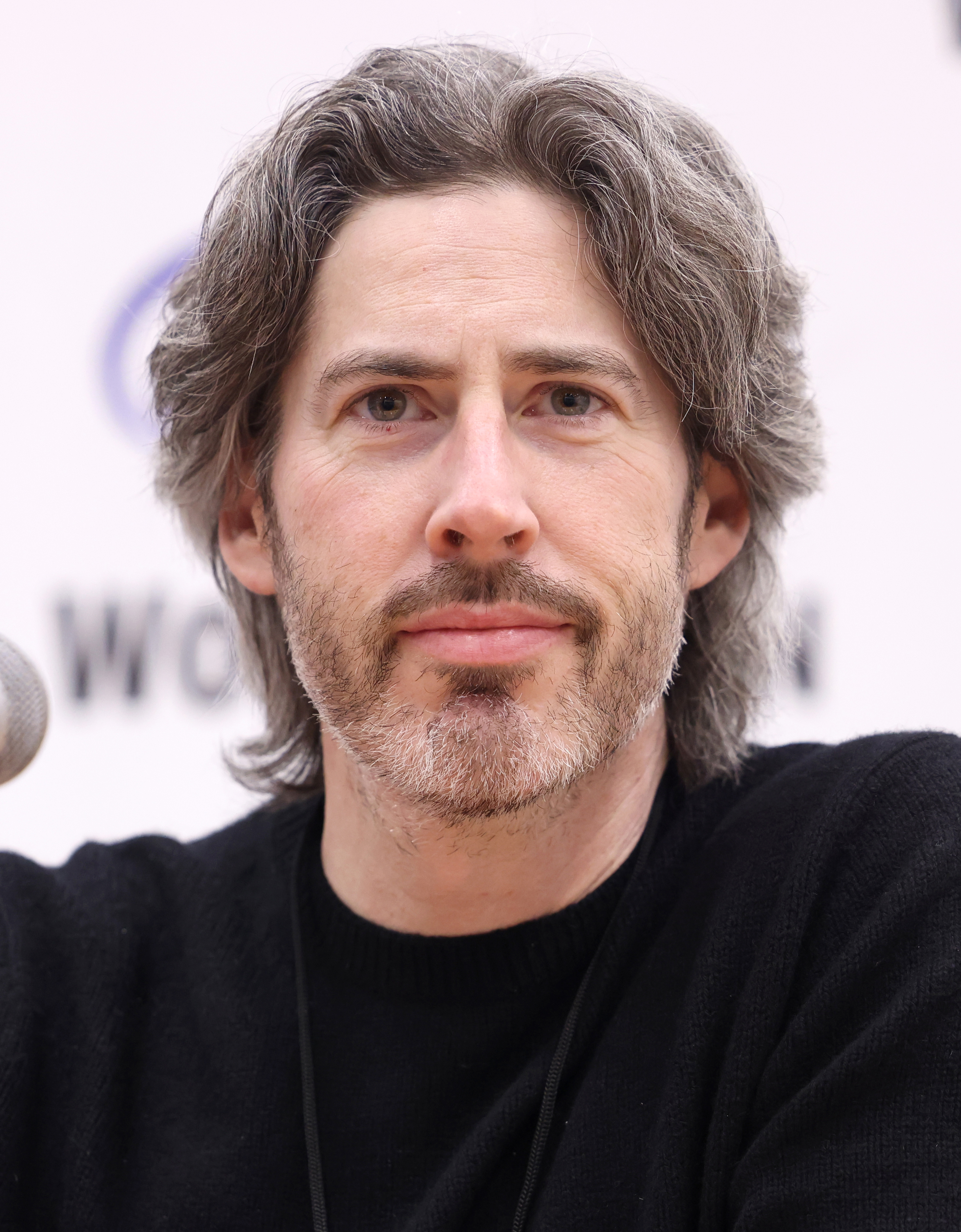
Jason Reitman won for Up in the Air (2009)

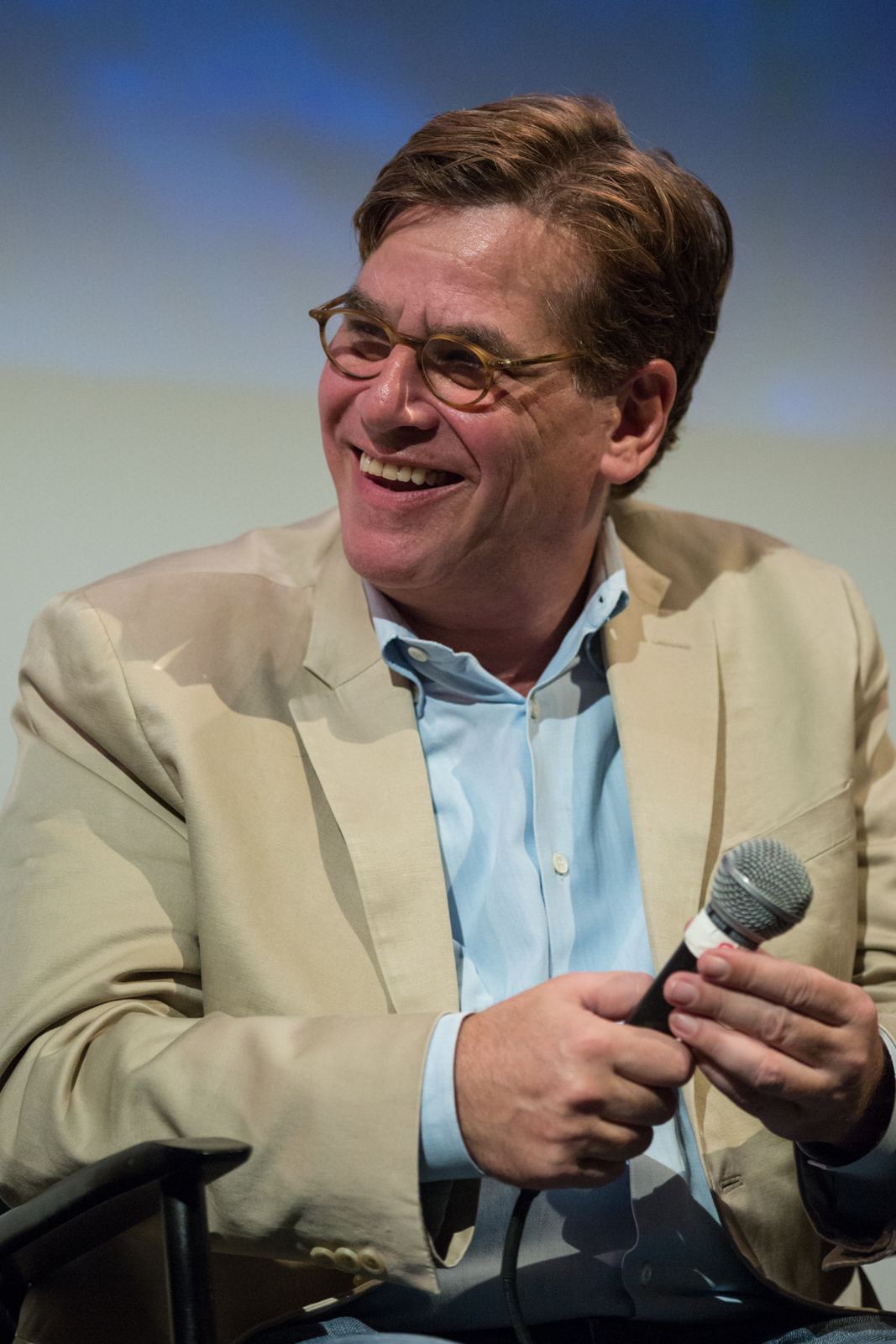
Aaron Sorkin won for The Social Network (2010)

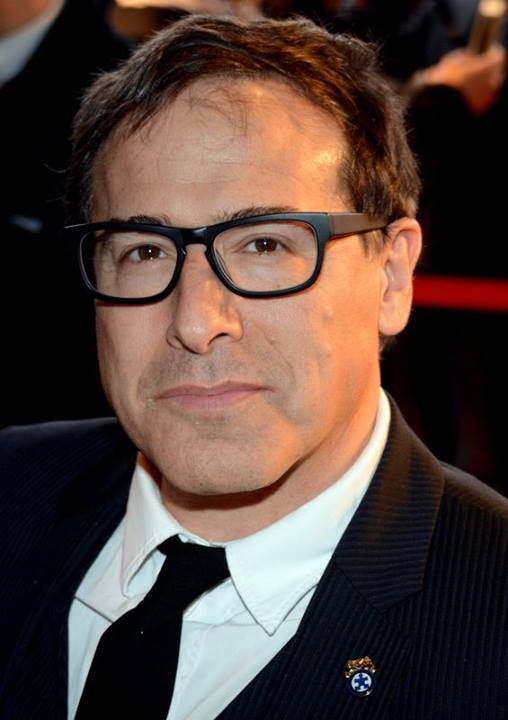
David O. Russell won for Silver Linings Playbook (2012)

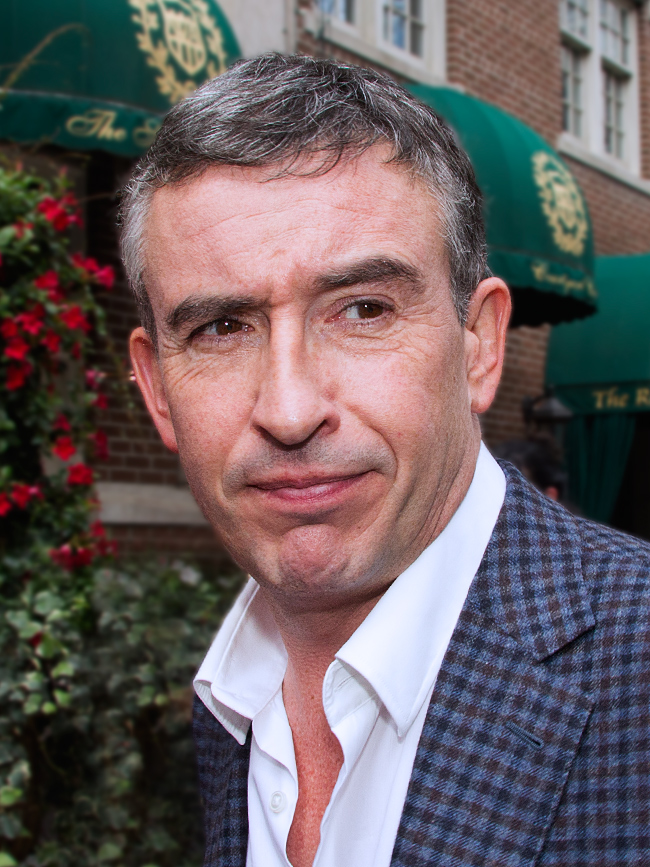
Steve Coogan won for Philomena (2013)

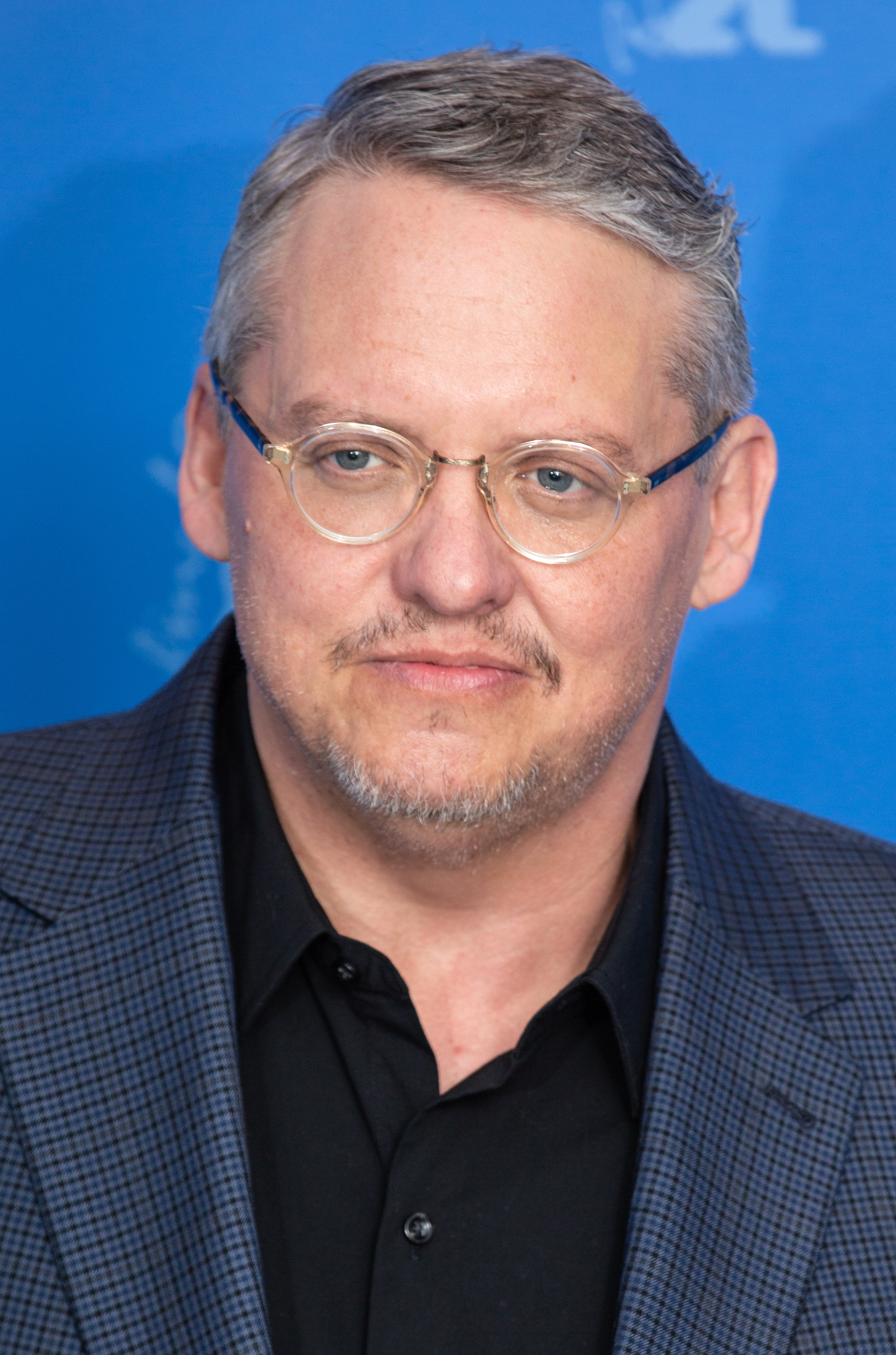
Adam McKay won for The Big Short (2015)

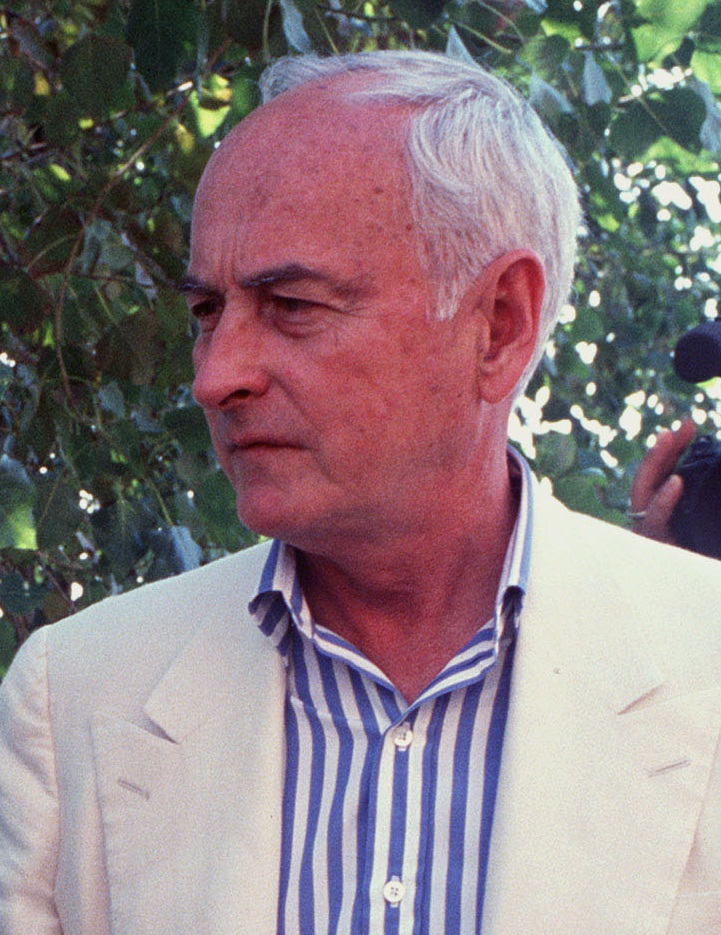
James Ivory won for Call Me by Your Name (2017)

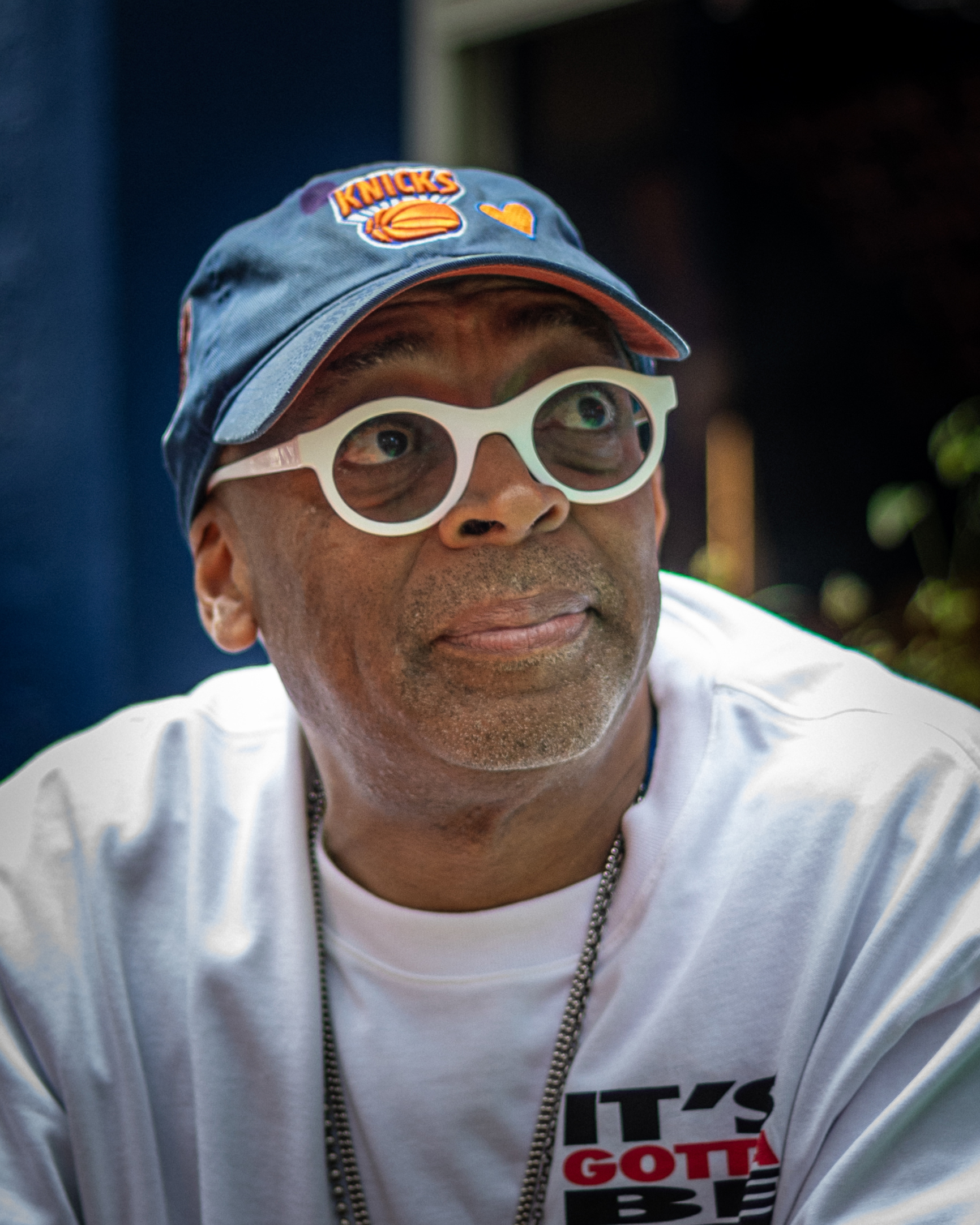
Spike Lee won for BlacKkKlansman (2018)

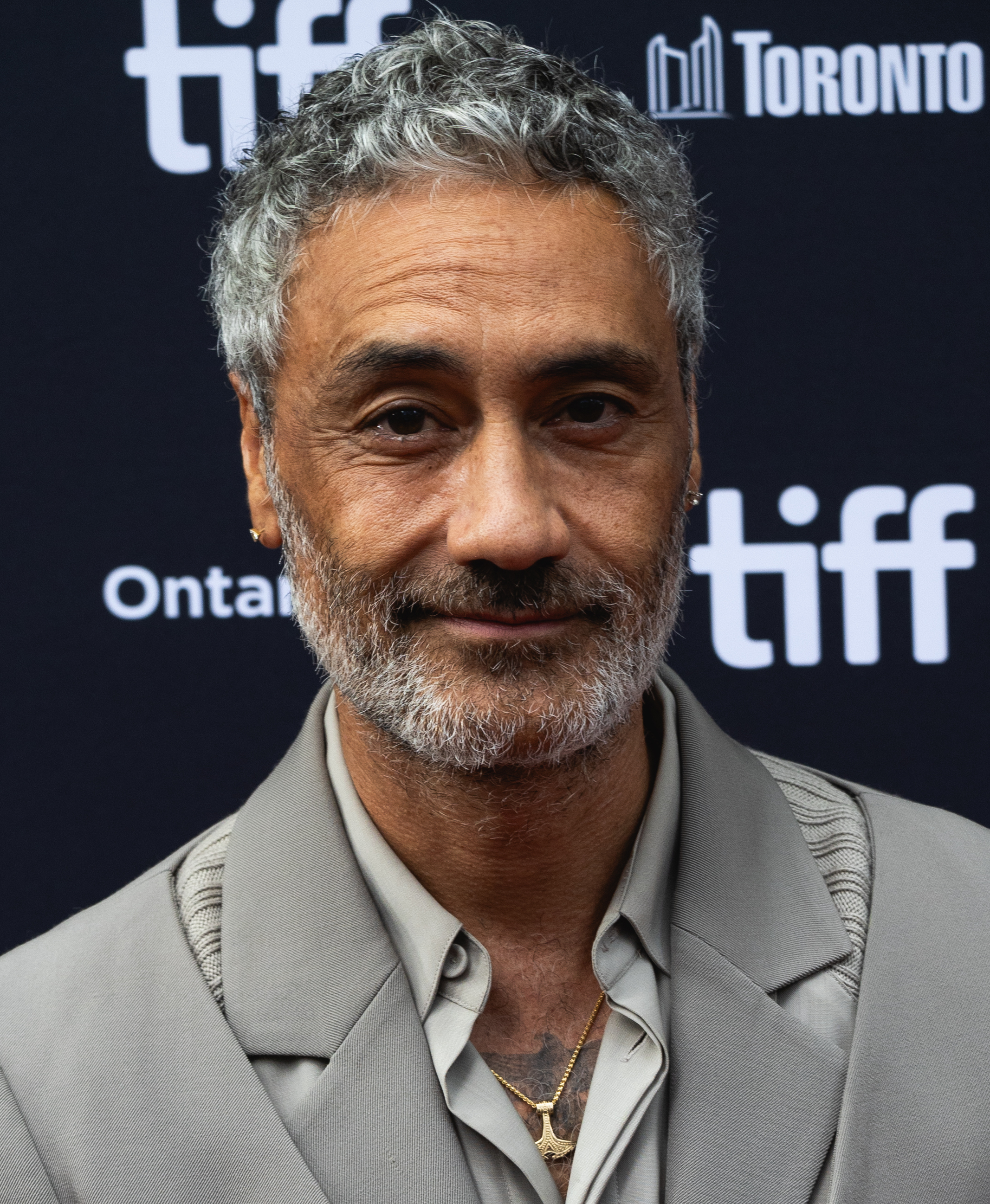
Taika Waititi won for Jojo Rabbit (2018)

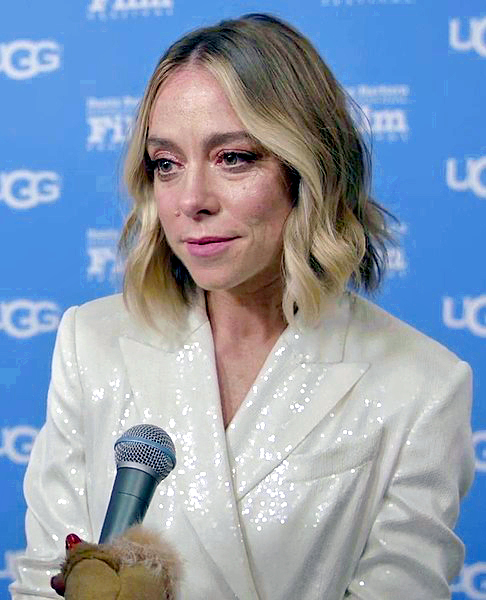
Sian Heder won for Coda (2021)

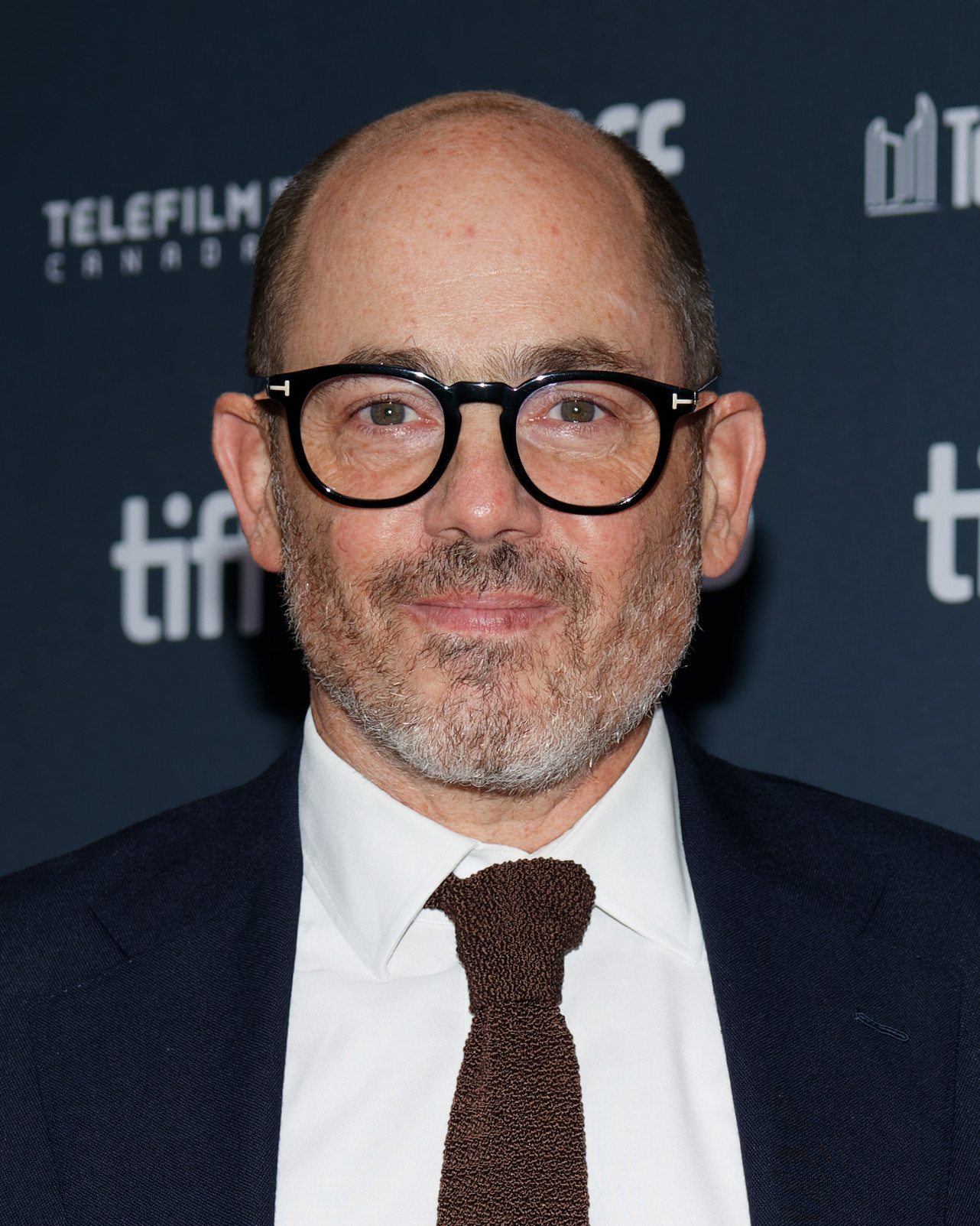
Edward Berger won for All Quiet on the Western Front (2022)

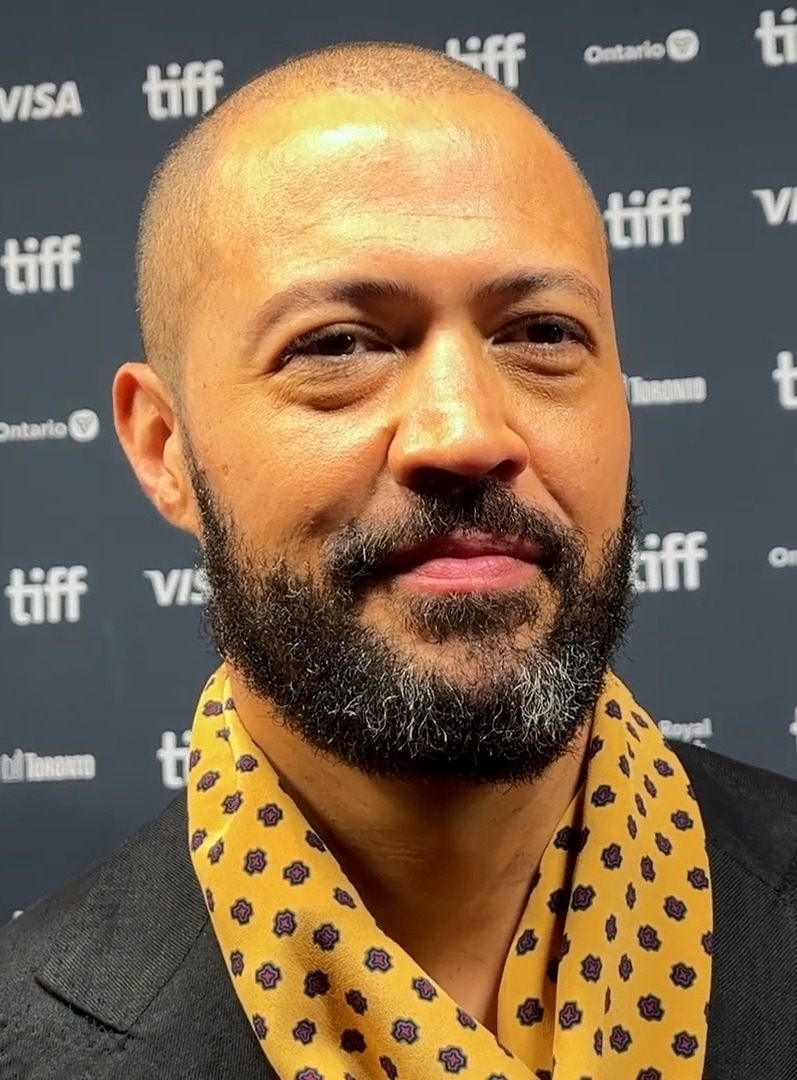
Cord Jefferson won for American Fiction (2023)

=== 1980s ===
Year	Film	Nominee
**1983** (37th)	**Heat and Dust**	**Ruth Prawer Jhabvala**
**1983** (37th)	Betrayal	Harold Pinter
**1983** (37th)	Educating Rita	Willy Russell
**1983** (37th)	Tootsie	Larry Gelbart and Murray Schisgal
**1984** (38th)	**The Killing Fields**	**Bruce Robinson**
**1984** (38th)	Another Country	Julian Mitchell
**1984** (38th)	The Dresser	Ronald Harwood
**1984** (38th)	Paris, Texas	Sam Shepard
**1985** (39th)	**Prizzi's Honor**	**Richard Condon and Janet Roach**
**1985** (39th)	Amadeus †	Peter Shaffer
**1985** (39th)	A Passage to India	David Lean
**1985** (39th)	The Shooting Party	Julian Bond
**1986** (40th)	**Out of Africa** †	**Kurt Luedtke**
**1986** (40th)	Children of a Lesser God	Hesper Anderson and Mark Medoff
**1986** (40th)	The Color Purple	Menno Meyjes
**1986** (40th)	Ran	Masato Ide, Akira Kurosawa, and Hideo Oguni
**1986** (40th)	A Room with a View †	Ruth Prawer Jhabvala
**1987** (41st)	**Jean de Florette**	**Claude Berri and Gérard Brach**
**1987** (41st)	84 Charing Cross Road	Hugh Whitemore
**1987** (41st)	Little Dorrit	Christine Edzard
**1987** (41st)	Prick Up Your Ears	Alan Bennett
**1988** (42nd)	**The Unbearable Lightness of Being**	**Jean-Claude Carrière and Philip Kaufman**
**1988** (42nd)	Babettes gæstebud	Gabriel Axel
**1988** (42nd)	Empire of the Sun	Tom Stoppard
**1988** (42nd)	Who Framed Roger Rabbit	Jeffrey Price and Peter S. Seaman
**1989** (43rd)	**Dangerous Liaisons** †	**Christopher Hampton**
**1989** (43rd)	The Accidental Tourist	Frank Galati and Lawrence Kasdan
**1989** (43rd)	My Left Foot	Shane Connaughton and Jim Sheridan
**1989** (43rd)	Shirley Valentine	Willy Russell

=== 1990s ===
Year	Film	Nominee
**1990** (44th)	**Goodfellas**	**Nicholas Pileggi and Martin Scorsese**
**1990** (44th)	Born on the Fourth of July	Ron Kovic and Oliver Stone
**1990** (44th)	Driving Miss Daisy †	Alfred Uhry
**1990** (44th)	Postcards from the Edge	Carrie Fisher
**1990** (44th)	The War of the Roses	Michael J. Leeson
**1991** (45th)	**The Commitments**	**Dick Clement, Roddy Doyle, and Ian La Frenais**
**1991** (45th)	Cyrano de Bergerac	Jean-Claude Carrière and Jean-Paul Rappeneau
**1991** (45th)	Dances with Wolves †	Michael Blake
**1991** (45th)	The Silence of the Lambs †	Ted Tally
**1992** (46th)	**The Player**	**Michael Tolkin**
**1992** (46th)	Howards End †	Ruth Prawer Jhabvala
**1992** (46th)	JFK	Zachary Sklar and Oliver Stone
**1992** (46th)	Strictly Ballroom	Baz Luhrmann and Craig Pearce
**1993** (47th)	**Schindler's List** †	**Steven Zaillian**
**1993** (47th)	In the Name of the Father	Terry George and Jim Sheridan
**1993** (47th)	The Remains of the Day	Ruth Prawer Jhabvala
**1993** (47th)	Shadowlands	William Nicholson
**1993** (47th)	Scent of a Woman	Bo Goldman
**1994** (48th)	**Quiz Show**	**Paul Attanasio**
**1994** (48th)	The Browning Version	Ronald Harwood
**1994** (48th)	Forrest Gump †	Eric Roth
**1994** (48th)	The Joy Luck Club	Ronald Bass and Amy Tan
**1995** (49th)	**Trainspotting**	**John Hodge**
**1995** (49th)	Babe	George Miller, Chris Noonan
**1995** (49th)	Leaving Las Vegas	Mike Figgis
**1995** (49th)	The Madness of King George	Alan Bennett
**1995** (49th)	Il Postino: The Postman	Anna Pavignano, Michael Radford, Furio Scarpelli, Giacomo Scarpelli, and Massimo Troisi
**1995** (49th)	Sense and Sensibility †	Emma Thompson
**1996** (50th)	**The English Patient**	**Anthony Minghella**
**1996** (50th)	The Crucible	Arthur Miller
**1996** (50th)	Evita	Alan Parker and Oliver Stone
**1996** (50th)	Richard III	Richard Loncraine and Ian McKellen
**1997** (51st)	**Romeo + Juliet**	**Baz Luhrmann and Craig Pearce**
**1997** (51st)	The Ice Storm	James Schamus
**1997** (51st)	L.A. Confidential †	Curtis Hanson and Brian Helgeland
**1997** (51st)	The Wings of the Dove	Hossein Amini
**1998** (52nd)	**Primary Colors**	**Elaine May**
**1998** (52nd)	Hilary and Jackie	Frank Cottrell Boyce
**1998** (52nd)	Little Voice	Mark Herman
**1998** (52nd)	Wag the Dog	Hilary Henkin and David Mamet
**1999** (53rd)	**The End of the Affair**	**Neil Jordan**
**1999** (53rd)	East Is East	Ayub Khan-Din
**1999** (53rd)	An Ideal Husband	Oliver Parker
**1999** (53rd)	The Talented Mr. Ripley	Anthony Minghella

=== 2000s ===
Year	Film	Nominee
**2000** (54th)	**Traffic** †	**Stephen Gaghan**
**2000** (54th)	Chocolat	Robert Nelson Jacobs
**2000** (54th)	Crouching Tiger, Hidden Dragon	James Schamus, Wang Hui-ling, and Kuo Jung Tsai
**2000** (54th)	High Fidelity	John Cusack, D. V. DeVincentis, Steve Pink, and Scott Rosenberg
**2000** (54th)	Wonder Boys	Steve Kloves
**2001** (55th)	**Shrek**	**Ted Elliott, Terry Rossio, Roger S. H. Schulman, and Joe Stillman**
**2001** (55th)	A Beautiful Mind †	Akiva Goldsman
**2001** (55th)	Bridget Jones's Diary	Richard Curtis, Andrew Davies, and Helen Fielding
**2001** (55th)	Iris	Richard Eyre and Charles Wood
**2001** (55th)	The Lord of the Rings: The Fellowship of the Ring	Philippa Boyens, Peter Jackson, and Fran Walsh
**2002** (56th)	**Adaptation**	**Charlie Kaufman and Donald Kaufman**
**2002** (56th)	About a Boy	Peter Hedges, Chris Weitz, and Paul Weitz
**2002** (56th)	Catch Me If You Can	Jeff Nathanson
**2002** (56th)	The Hours	David Hare
**2002** (56th)	The Pianist †	Ronald Harwood
**2003** (57th)	**The Lord of the Rings: The Return of the King** †	**Philippa Boyens, Peter Jackson, and Fran Walsh**
**2003** (57th)	Big Fish	John August
**2003** (57th)	Cold Mountain	Anthony Minghella
**2003** (57th)	Girl with a Pearl Earring	Olivia Hetreed
**2003** (57th)	Mystic River	Brian Helgeland
**2004** (58th)	**Sideways** †	**Alexander Payne and Jim Taylor**
**2004** (58th)	The Chorus	Christophe Barratier and Philippe Lopes-Curval
**2004** (58th)	Closer	Patrick Marber
**2004** (58th)	Finding Neverland	David Magee
**2004** (58th)	The Motorcycle Diaries	José Rivera
**2005** (59th)	**Brokeback Mountain** †	**Larry McMurtry and Diana Ossana**
**2005** (59th)	Capote	Dan Futterman
**2005** (59th)	The Constant Gardener	Jeffrey Caine
**2005** (59th)	A History of Violence	Josh Olson
**2005** (59th)	Pride & Prejudice	Deborah Moggach
**2006** (60th)	**The Last King of Scotland**	**Jeremy Brock and Peter Morgan**
**2006** (60th)	Casino Royale	Paul Haggis, Neal Purvis, and Robert Wade
**2006** (60th)	The Departed †	William Monahan
**2006** (60th)	The Devil Wears Prada	Aline Brosh McKenna
**2006** (60th)	Notes on a Scandal	Patrick Marber
**2007** (61st)	**The Diving Bell and the Butterfly**	**Ronald Harwood**
**2007** (61st)	Atonement	Christopher Hampton
**2007** (61st)	The Kite Runner	David Benioff
**2007** (61st)	No Country for Old Men †	Joel Coen and Ethan Coen
**2007** (61st)	There Will Be Blood	Paul Thomas Anderson
**2008** (62nd)	**Slumdog Millionaire** †	**Simon Beaufoy**
**2008** (62nd)	The Curious Case of Benjamin Button	Eric Roth
**2008** (62nd)	Frost/Nixon	Peter Morgan
**2008** (62nd)	The Reader	David Hare
**2008** (62nd)	Revolutionary Road	Justin Haythe
**2009** (63rd)	**Up in the Air**	**Jason Reitman and Sheldon Turner**
**2009** (63rd)	District 9	Neill Blomkamp and Terri Tatchell
**2009** (63rd)	An Education	Nick Hornby
**2009** (63rd)	In the Loop	Simon Blackwell, Jesse Armstrong, Armando Iannucci, and Tony Roche
**2009** (63rd)	Precious †	Geoffrey Fletcher

=== 2010s ===
Year	Film	Nominee
**2010** (64th)	**The Social Network** †	**Aaron Sorkin**
**2010** (64th)	127 Hours	Danny Boyle and Simon Beaufoy
**2010** (64th)	The Girl with the Dragon Tattoo	Rasmus Heisterberg and Nikolaj Arcel
**2010** (64th)	Toy Story 3	Michael Arndt
**2010** (64th)	True Grit	Joel Coen and Ethan Coen
**2011** (65th)	**Tinker Tailor Soldier Spy**	**Bridget O'Connor and Peter Straughan**
**2011** (65th)	The Descendants †	Alexander Payne, Nat Faxon, and Jim Rash
**2011** (65th)	The Help	Tate Taylor
**2011** (65th)	The Ides of March	George Clooney, Beau Willimon, and Grant Heslov
**2011** (65th)	Moneyball	Steven Zaillian and Aaron Sorkin
**2012** (66th)	**Silver Linings Playbook**	**David O. Russell**
**2012** (66th)	Argo †	Chris Terrio
**2012** (66th)	Beasts of the Southern Wild	Lucy Alibar and Benh Zeitlin
**2012** (66th)	Life of Pi	David Magee
**2012** (66th)	Lincoln	Tony Kushner
**2013** (67th)	**Philomena**	**Steve Coogan and Jeff Pope**
**2013** (67th)	12 Years a Slave †	John Ridley
**2013** (67th)	Behind the Candelabra	Richard LaGravenese
**2013** (67th)	Captain Phillips	Billy Ray
**2013** (67th)	The Wolf of Wall Street	Terence Winter
**2014** (68th)	**The Theory of Everything**	**Anthony McCarten**
**2014** (68th)	American Sniper	Jason Hall
**2014** (68th)	Gone Girl	Gillian Flynn
**2014** (68th)	The Imitation Game †	Graham Moore
**2014** (68th)	Paddington	Paul King
**2015** (69th)	**The Big Short** †	**Adam McKay and Charles Randolph**
**2015** (69th)	Brooklyn	Nick Hornby
**2015** (69th)	Carol	Phyllis Nagy
**2015** (69th)	Room	Emma Donoghue
**2015** (69th)	Steve Jobs	Aaron Sorkin
**2016** (70th)	**Lion**	**Luke Davies**
**2016** (70th)	Arrival	Eric Heisserer
**2016** (70th)	Hacksaw Ridge	Andrew Knight and Robert Schenkkan
**2016** (70th)	Hidden Figures	Allison Schroeder and Theodore Melfi
**2016** (70th)	Nocturnal Animals	Tom Ford
**2017** (71st)	**Call Me by Your Name** †	**James Ivory**
**2017** (71st)	The Death of Stalin	Armando Iannucci, Ian Martin, and David Schneider
**2017** (71st)	Film Stars Don't Die in Liverpool	Matt Greenhalgh
**2017** (71st)	Molly's Game	Aaron Sorkin
**2017** (71st)	Paddington 2	Simon Farnaby and Paul King
**2018** (72nd)	**BlacKkKlansman** †	**Charlie Wachtel, David Rabinowitz, Kevin Willmott, and Spike Lee**
**2018** (72nd)	Can You Ever Forgive Me?	Nicole Holofcener and Jeff Whitty
**2018** (72nd)	First Man	Josh Singer
**2018** (72nd)	If Beale Street Could Talk	Barry Jenkins
**2018** (72nd)	A Star Is Born	Eric Roth, Bradley Cooper, and Will Fetters
**2019** (73rd)	**Jojo Rabbit** †	**Taika Waititi**
**2019** (73rd)	The Irishman	Steven Zaillian
**2019** (73rd)	Joker	Todd Phillips and Scott Silver
**2019** (73rd)	Little Women	Greta Gerwig
**2019** (73rd)	The Two Popes	Anthony McCarten

=== 2020s ===
Year	Film	Nominee
**2020** (74th)	**The Father** †	**Christopher Hampton and Florian Zeller**
**2020** (74th)	The Dig	Moira Buffini
**2020** (74th)	The Mauritanian	Rory Haines, Sohrab Noshirvani, and M.B. Traven
**2020** (74th)	Nomadland	Chloé Zhao
**2020** (74th)	The White Tiger	Ramin Bahrani
**2021** (75th)	**CODA** †	**Sian Heder**
**2021** (75th)	Drive My Car	Ryusuke Hamaguchi and Takamasa Oe
**2021** (75th)	Dune	Eric Roth, Jon Spaihts, and Denis Villeneuve
**2021** (75th)	The Lost Daughter	Maggie Gyllenhaal
**2021** (75th)	The Power of the Dog	Jane Campion
**2022** (76th)	**All Quiet on the Western Front**	**Edward Berger, Lesley Paterson, and Ian Stokell**
**2022** (76th)	Living	Kazuo Ishiguro
**2022** (76th)	The Quiet Girl	Colm Bairéad
**2022** (76th)	She Said	Rebecca Lenkiewicz
**2022** (76th)	The Whale	Samuel D. Hunter
**2023** (77th)	**American Fiction** †	**Cord Jefferson**
**2023** (77th)	All of Us Strangers	Andrew Haigh
**2023** (77th)	Oppenheimer	Christopher Nolan
**2023** (77th)	Poor Things	Tony McNamara
**2023** (77th)	The Zone of Interest	Jonathan Glazer
**2024** (78th)	**Conclave** †	**Peter Straughan**
**2024** (78th)	A Complete Unknown	James Mangold and Jay Cocks
**2024** (78th)	Emilia Pérez	Jacques Audiard
**2024** (78th)	Nickel Boys	RaMell Ross and Joslyn Barnes
**2024** (78th)	Sing Sing	Clint Bentley, Greg Kwedar, Clarence 'Divine Eye' Maclin, and John 'Divine G' Whitfield
**2025** (79th)	**One Battle After Another** †	**Paul Thomas Anderson**
**2025** (79th)	The Ballad of Wallis Island	Tom Basden and Tim Key
**2025** (79th)	Bugonia	Will Tracy
**2025** (79th)	Hamnet	Chloé Zhao and Maggie O'Farrell
**2025** (79th)	Pillion	Harry Lighton

== Multiple wins and nominations ==
=== Multiple wins ===
Wins	Screenwriter
2	Christopher Hampton
2	Peter Straughan

=== Multiple nominations ===
Nominations	Screenwriter
4	Ronald Harwood
4	Ruth Prawer Jhabvala
4	Eric Roth
4	Aaron Sorkin
3	Christopher Hampton
3	Anthony Minghella
3	Oliver Stone
3	Steven Zaillian
2	Paul Thomas Anderson
2	Simon Beaufoy
2	Alan Bennett
2	Philippa Boyens
2	Jean-Claude Carrière
2	Joel Coen and Ethan Coen
2	David Hare
2	Brian Helgeland
2	Nick Hornby
2	Armando Iannucci
2	Peter Jackson
2	Paul King
2	Baz Luhrmann
2	David Magee
2	Anthony McCarten
2	Patrick Marber
2	Peter Morgan
2	Alexander Payne
2	Craig Pearce
2	Willy Russell
2	James Schamus
2	Jim Sheridan
2	Peter Straughan
2	Fran Walsh
2	Chloé Zhao

== See also ==
- Golden Globe Award for Best Screenplay
- Academy Award for Best Adapted Screenplay
- AACTA International Award for Best Screenplay
- Critics' Choice Movie Award for Best Adapted Screenplay
- Writers Guild of America Award for Best Adapted Screenplay
