= Ruth Prawer Jhabvala =

British-American writer (1927–2013)

Ruth Prawer Jhabvala CBE
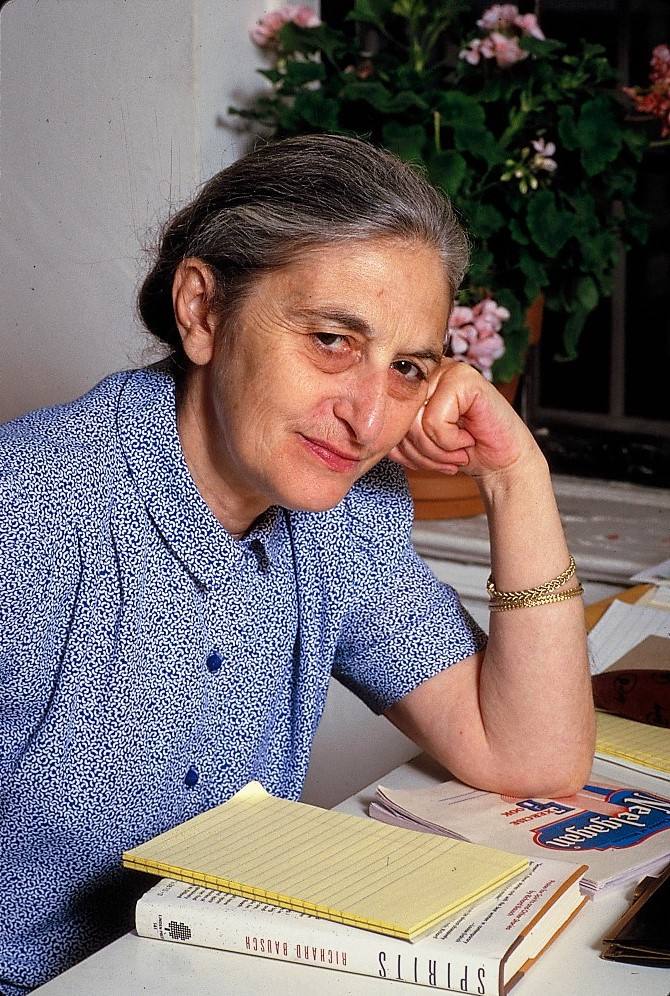
- Jhabvala in 1987
- Born: Ruth Prawer; 7 May 1927; Cologne, Weimar Republic
- Died: 3 April 2013 (aged 85); New York City, U.S.
- Citizenship: United Kingdom (1948–2013); United States (1986–2013)
- Education: Queen Mary University of London
- Occupations: Novelist; screenwriter
- Spouse: Cyrus Jhabvala (m. 1951)
- Children: 3, including Renana
- Relatives: Siegbert Salomon Prawer (brother)
- Writing career
- Period: 1955–2013
- Notable awards: Academy Award for Best Adapted Screenplay 1986 A Room with a View 1992 Howards End; BAFTA Award for Best Adapted Screenplay 1983 Heat and Dust; Booker Prize 1975 Heat and Dust; MacArthur Fellowship 1984; Writers Guild of America Award for Best Adapted Screenplay 1986 A Room with a View

Ruth Prawer Jhabvala CBE (née Prawer; 7 May 1927 – 3 April 2013) was a British and American novelist and screenwriter. She is best known for her collaboration with Merchant Ivory Productions, made up of film director James Ivory and producer Ismail Merchant.

After marrying Indian architect Cyrus Jhabvala in 1951 and moving from England to New Delhi, she began to write novels and tales on Indian subjects. She wrote a dozen novels, 23 screenplays, and eight collections of short stories. After moving to the United States, she started writing screenplays for Merchant Ivory films. She is the only person to have won both a Booker Prize and an Oscar.

== Early life and education ==
Ruth Prawer was born on 7 May 1927 in Cologne, Germany, during the Weimar Republic, to Jewish parents Marcus and Eleanora (Cohn) Prawer. Marcus was a lawyer who had moved to Germany from Poland to escape conscription, and Eleanora's father was cantor of Cologne's largest synagogue. Her father was accused of having Communist links, and was arrested and then released. Ruth witnessed the violence unleashed against the Jews during the Kristallnacht. The family was among the last group of refugees to flee the Nazi regime in 1939, emigrating to Britain.

During World War II, Prawer lived in Hendon in London, experienced the Blitz and began to speak English rather than German. She read the works of Charles Dickens, and she read Margaret Mitchell's Gone with the Wind while taking refuge in air raid shelters during the Luftwaffe's bombing of London.

She became a British citizen in 1948. The following year, her father committed suicide after discovering that 40 members of his family had been murdered during the Holocaust. Prawer attended Hendon County School, and then Queen Mary College, where she received an MA in English literature in 1951.

== Literary career ==
=== Years in India ===
Ruth Prawer moved to India in 1951 after marrying Indian Parsi architect Cyrus Jhabvala. Her first novel, To Whom She Will, was published in 1955. It was followed by Esmond in India (1957), The Householder (1960) and Get Ready for Battle (1963). The Householder, with a screenplay by Jhabvala, was filmed in 1963 by Merchant and Ivory. During her years in India, she wrote scripts for the Merchant-Ivory duo for The Guru (1969) and Autobiography of a Princess (1975). She collaborated with Ivory for the screenplays for Bombay Talkie (1970) and ABC After-school Specials: William - The Life and Times of William Shakespeare (1973).

In 1975, she won the Booker Prize for her novel Heat and Dust, later adapted into a film. That year, she moved to New York where she wrote The Place of Peace. Her husband also moved to US permanently in late 1980s, and the couple lived on the east coast until Ruth's death in 2013. Cyrus Jhabwala died in Los Angeles in 2014.

Jhabvala "remained ill at ease with India and all that it brought into her life." She wrote in an autobiographical essay, Myself in India (published in London Magazine) that she found the "great animal of poverty and backwardness" made the idea and sensation of India intolerable to her, a "Central European with an English education and a deplorable tendency to constant self-analysis." Her early works in India dwell on the themes of romantic love and arranged marriages and are portraits of the social mores, idealism and chaos of the early decades of independent India. Writing about her in the New York Times, novelist Pankaj Mishra observed that "she was probably the first writer in English to see that India's Westernizing middle class, so preoccupied with marriage, lent itself well to Jane Austenish comedies of manners."

=== Life in the United States ===
Jhabvala moved to New York City in 1975 and lived there until her death in 2013, becoming a naturalized citizen of the United States in 1986. She continued to write and many of her works including In Search of Love and Beauty (1983), Three Continents (1987), Shards of Memory (1995) and East into Upper East: Plain Tales From New York and New Delhi (1998) portray the lives and predicaments of immigrants from post-Nazi and post-World War Europe. Many of these works feature India as a setting where her characters go in search of spiritual enlightenment only to emerge defrauded and exposed to the materialistic pursuits of the East. The New York Times Review of Books chose her Out of India (1986) as one of the best reads for that year. In 1984, she was awarded a MacArthur Fellowship.

In 2005 she published My Nine Lives: Chapters of a Possible Past with illustrations by her husband and the book was described as "her most autobiographical fiction to date".

=== Reception ===
Her literary works were well received, with C. P. Snow, Rumer Godden and V. S. Pritchett describing her work as "the highest art", "a balance between subtlety, humour and beauty" and as being Chekhovian in its detached sense of comic self-delusion. Salman Rushdie described her as a "rootless intellectual" when he anthologized her in the Vintage Book of Indian Writing, and John Updike described her an "initiated outsider".

Jhabvala initially was assumed to be an Indian among the reading public because of her perceptive portrayals of the nuances of Indian lifestyles. Later, the revelation of her true identity led to falling sales of her books in India and made her a target of accusations about "her old-fashioned colonial attitudes".

Jhabvala's last published story was "The Judge's Will", which appeared in The New Yorker on 25 March 2013.

== Merchant Ivory Productions ==
In 1963, Jhabvala was approached by James Ivory and Ismail Merchant to write a screenplay for their debut The Householder, based on her 1960 novel. During their first encounter, Merchant later said Jhabvala, seeking to avoid them, pretended to be the housemaid when they visited. The film, released by Merchant Ivory Productions in 1963 and starring Shashi Kapoor and Leela Naidu, met with critical praise and marked the beginning of a partnership that resulted in over 20 films.

The Householder was followed by Shakespeare Wallah (1965), another critically acclaimed film. There followed a series of films, including Roseland (1977), Hullabaloo Over Georgie and Bonnie's Pictures (1978), The Europeans (1979), Jane Austen in Manhattan (1980), Quartet (1981), The Courtesans of Bombay (1983) and The Bostonians (1984). The Merchant Ivory production of Heat and Dust in 1983 won Jhabvala a BAFTA Award for Best Adapted Screenplay the following year.

She won her first Academy Award for her screenplay for A Room with a View (1986) and won a second in the same category for Howards End six years later. She was nominated for a third Academy Award for Best Adapted Screenplay the following year for The Remains of the Day.

Her other films with Merchant and Ivory include Mr. & Mrs. Bridge (1990), Jefferson in Paris (1995), Surviving Picasso (1996), A Soldier's Daughter Never Cries (1998) (the screenplay for which she co-authored with Ivory), The Golden Bowl (2000) and The City of Your Final Destination (2009), adapted from the eponymous novel by Peter Cameron and was her last screenplay. Le Divorce which she co-wrote with Ivory was the last movie that featured the trio of Merchant, Ivory, and Jhabvala.

In an interview for the British Film Institute, British actor James Wilby said that Jhabvala refused to write the screenplay of the 1987 film Maurice, despite being "the normal writer" for Merchant-Ivory films. The film was based on a posthumously published novel by E. M. Forster which depicted a gay relationship set in Edwardian England. Jhabvala did provide notes for Maurice, but said that she did not wish to write the screenplay as the novel was "sub-Forster and sub-Ivory."

The Merchant-Ivory duo was acknowledged by the Guinness Book of World Records as the longest collaboration between a director and a producer, but Jhabvala was a part of the trio from the very beginning. She introduced the composer Richard Robbins, who went on to score music for almost every production by Merchant Ivory beginning with The Europeans in 1979, to the duo after meeting him while he was the director of Mannes College of Music, New York. Madame Sousatzka (1988) was the one film she wrote that was not produced by Merchant Ivory.

== Selected filmography ==
Year	Title	Other notes
1963	The Householder	screenplay, adapted from the novel by Jhabvala
1965	Shakespeare Wallah	screenplay
1969	The Guru	screenplay
1970	Bombay Talkie	screenplay
1975	Autobiography of a Princess	written by
1977	Roseland	story and screenplay
1978	Hullabaloo Over Georgie and Bonnie's Pictures	written by
1979	The Europeans	screenplay, adapted from the novel by Henry James
1980	Jane Austen in Manhattan	written by, inserted libretto "Sir Charles Grandison" by Jane Austen
1981	Quartet	screenplay, adapted from the novel by Jean Rhys
1983	Heat and Dust	screenplay, adapted from the novel by Jhabvala
1984	The Bostonians	screenplay, adapted from the novel by Henry James
1985	A Room with a View	screenplay, adapted from the novel by E.M. Forster
1988	Madame Sousatzka	screenplay, adapted from the novel by Bernice Rubens. Directed by John Schlesinger
1990	Mr. & Mrs. Bridge	screenplay, adapted from the novels by Evan S. Connell (Mr. Bridge & Mrs. Bridge)
1992	Howards End	screenplay, adapted from the novel by E.M. Forster
1993	The Remains of the Day	screenplay, adapted from the novel by Kazuo Ishiguro
1995	Jefferson in Paris	screenplay
1996	Surviving Picasso	screenplay
1998	A Soldier's Daughter Never Cries	screenplay, adapted from the novel by Kaylie Jones
2000	The Golden Bowl	screenplay, adapted from the novel by Henry James
2003	Le Divorce	co-written by James Ivory, adapted from the novel by Diane Johnson
2009	The City of Your Final Destination	screenplay, adapted from the novel by Peter Cameron

== Honours and awards ==
Jhabvala was made a Commander of the Order of the British Empire in the Diplomatic Service and Overseas List of the 1998 New Years Honours. She was granted a joint fellowship by BAFTA in 2002 with Ivory and Merchant.

She is the only person to have won both a Booker Prize and an Oscar.

=== Major film awards and nominations ===
Academy Awards

Year	Category	Film	Result	Ref.
1986	Best Adapted Screenplay	A Room with a View	Won	
1992	Best Adapted Screenplay	Howards End	Won	
1993	Best Adapted Screenplay	The Remains of the Day	Nominated	

Golden Globe Awards

Year	Category	Film	Result	Ref.
1992	Best Screenplay	Howards End	Nominated	
1993	Best Screenplay	The Remains of the Day	Nominated	

British Academy Film Awards

Year	Category	Film	Result	Ref.
1983	Best Adapted Screenplay	Heat and Dust	Won	
1986	Best Adapted Screenplay	A Room with a View	Nominated	
1992	Best Adapted Screenplay	Howards End	Nominated	
1993	Best Adapted Screenplay	The Remains of the Day	Nominated	

Writers Guild of America Awards

Year	Category	Film	Result	Ref.
1986	Best Adapted Screenplay	A Room with a View	Won	
1992	Best Adapted Screenplay	Howards End	Nominated	
1993	Best Adapted Screenplay	The Remains of the Day	Nominated	
1993	Screen Laurel Award	—N/a	Won	

=== Other awards ===
- 1975: Booker Prize – Heat and Dust
- 1976: Guggenheim Fellowship
- 1979: Neil Gunn Prize
- 1984: MacArthur Fellowship
- 1984: London Critics Circle Film Awards – Screenwriter of the Year (Heat and Dust)
- 1990: New York Film Critics Circle Awards – Best Screenplay (Mr. and Mrs. Bridge)
- 2003: O. Henry Award (Refuge in London)

== Personal life and death ==
In 1951, Prawer married Cyrus Shavaksha Hormusji Jhabvala, an Indian Parsi architect and, later, head of the School of Planning and Architecture, New Delhi. The couple moved into a house in Delhi's Civil Lines where they raised three daughters: Ava, Firoza and Renana. In 1975, Jhabvala moved to New York and divided her time between India and the United States. In 1986, she became a naturalized citizen of the United States.

Her elder brother, Siegbert Salomon Prawer (1925–2012), an expert on Heinrich Heine and horror films, was fellow of The Queen's College and Taylor Professor of German Language and Literature at the University of Oxford.

Jhabvala died in her home in New York City on 3 April 2013 at the age of 85. James Ivory reported that her death was caused by complications from a pulmonary disorder. Reacting to her death, Merchant Ivory Productions said that Jhabvala had "been a beloved member of the Merchant Ivory family since 1960, comprising one-third of our indomitable trifecta that included director James Ivory and the late producer Ismail Merchant" and that her death was "a significant loss to the global film community".

== Literary works ==
=== Novels and novellas ===
Year	Title	Other notes
1955	To whom she will : a novel	Published in the United States as Amrita
1956	The Nature of Passion	
1958	Esmond in India	
1960	The Householder	
1962	Get Ready for Battle	
1965	A Backward Place	
1972	A New Dominion	published in the United States as Travelers
1975	Heat and Dust	
1983	In Search of Love and Beauty	
1987	Three Continents	
1993	Poet and Dancer	
1995	Shards of Memory	

=== Short stories and collections ===
Year	Title	Other notes
1963	Like Birds, Like Fishes	
1968	A Stronger Climate	
1971	An Experience of India	
1976	How I Became a Holy Mother and other stories	
1986	Out of India: Selected Stories	
1998	East into Upper East: Plain Tales from New York and New Delhi	
2004	My Nine Lives : Chapters of a Possible Past	
2008	The Teacher	"The Teacher". The New Yorker. Volume:84. 28 July 2008
2011	A Lovesong for India: Tales from East and West	
2013	A Judge's Will	"The judge's will". The New Yorker. Vol. 89, no. 6. 25 March 2013. pp. 88–95.
2018	At the End of the Century: The Stories of Ruth Prawer Jhabvala	

=== Critical studies and reviews of Jhabvala's work ===
Anthologies and encyclopedias

- Prawer Jhabvala, Ruth (2000). "Passion". In Bausch, Richard; Cassill, R. V. (eds.). Norton Anthology of Short Fiction (6th ed.). New York: W.W. Norton. pp. 801–813. ISBN 978-0-39397-508-6.
- Prawer Jhabvala, Ruth (2005). "Two more under the Indian sun". In Mishra, Pankaj (ed.). India in Mind: An Anthology. New York: Vintage Books. pp. 108–130. ISBN 978-0-37572-745-0.
- Prawer Jhabvala, Ruth (1999). "An experience of India". In Ross, Robert (ed.). Colonial and Postcolonial Fiction in English: An Anthology. New York: Garland. pp. 189–209. ISBN 978-0-81531-431-8.
- Serafin, Steven, ed. (1999). "Ruth Prawer Jhabvala". Encyclopedia of World Literature in the 20th Century. Vol. 4 (L-Z) (3rd ed.). Farmington Hills, Michigan: St. James Press. ISBN 978-1-55862-377-4.

Screenwriting

- Bailur, Jayanti (1992). Ruth Prawer Jhabvala: Fiction and Film. New Delhi: Arnold Publishers.
- Katz, Susan Bullington, ed. (2000). "Ruth Prawer Jhabvala". Conversations with Screenwriters. Portsmouth, New Hampshire: Heinemann. pp. 1–8. ISBN 978-0-32500-295-8.

Other

- Crane, Ralph J. (1992). Ruth Prawer Jhabvala. New York: Twayne. ISBN 978-0-80577-030-8.
- Crane, Ralph J. (1991). Passages to Ruth Prawer Jhabvala. New Delhi: Sterling Publishers. ISBN 978-8-12071-355-0.
- Jasanoff, Maya (7 January 2019). "A passage from India : Ruth Prawer Jhabvala and the art of ambivalence". The Critics. A Critic at Large. The New Yorker. Vol. 94, no. 43. pp. 62–67.
- Rai, Sudha (1992). Homeless by Choice: Naipaul, Jhabvala, Rushdie and India. Jaipur: Printwell. ISBN 978-8-17044-241-7.
- Shepherd, Ronald (1994). Ruth Prawer Jhabvala in India: The Jewish Connection. Delhi: Chanakya Publications. ISBN 978-8-17001-096-8.
- Sucher, Laurie (1989). The Fiction of Ruth Prawer Jhabvala: The Politics of Passion. Basingstoke: Macmillan. ISBN 978-0-33342-196-3.

== See also ==
- List of Academy Award winners and nominees from Great Britain
