= 37th British Academy Film Awards =

1984 film awards ceremony

- Date: 25 March 1984
- Site: Grosvenor House Hotel
- Hosted by: Michael Aspel

Highlights
- Best Film: Educating Rita
- Best Actor: Michael Caine and Dustin Hoffman; Educating Rita and Tootsie
- Best Actress: Julie Walters; Educating Rita
- Most awards: Educating Rita (3)
- Most nominations: Tootsie (10)

The 37th British Academy Film Awards, more commonly known as the BAFTAs, took place on 25 March 1984 at the Grosvenor House Hotel in London, honouring the best national and foreign films of 1983. Presented by the British Academy of Film and Television Arts, accolades were handed out for the best feature-length film and documentaries of any nationality that were screened at British cinemas in 1983.

Lewis Gilbert's Educating Rita won the award for Best Film. Dustin Hoffman and Michael Caine tied for Best Actor, while Julie Walters took home Best Actress and Denholm Elliott and Jamie Lee Curtis won the supporting categories.

The ceremony was hosted by Michael Aspel.

== Winners and nominees ==
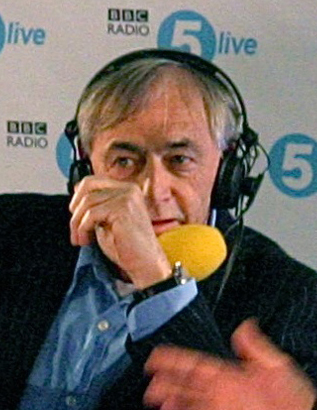
Bill Forsyth, Best Director winner

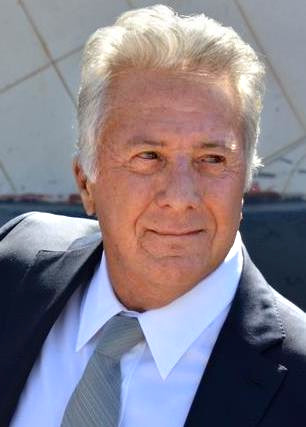
Dustin Hoffman, Best Actor co-winner

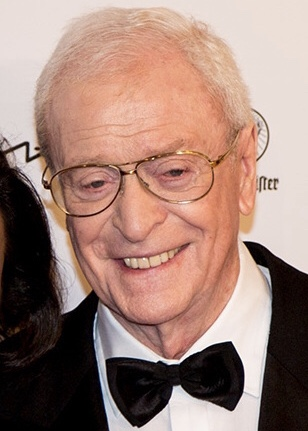
Michael Caine, Best Actor co-winner

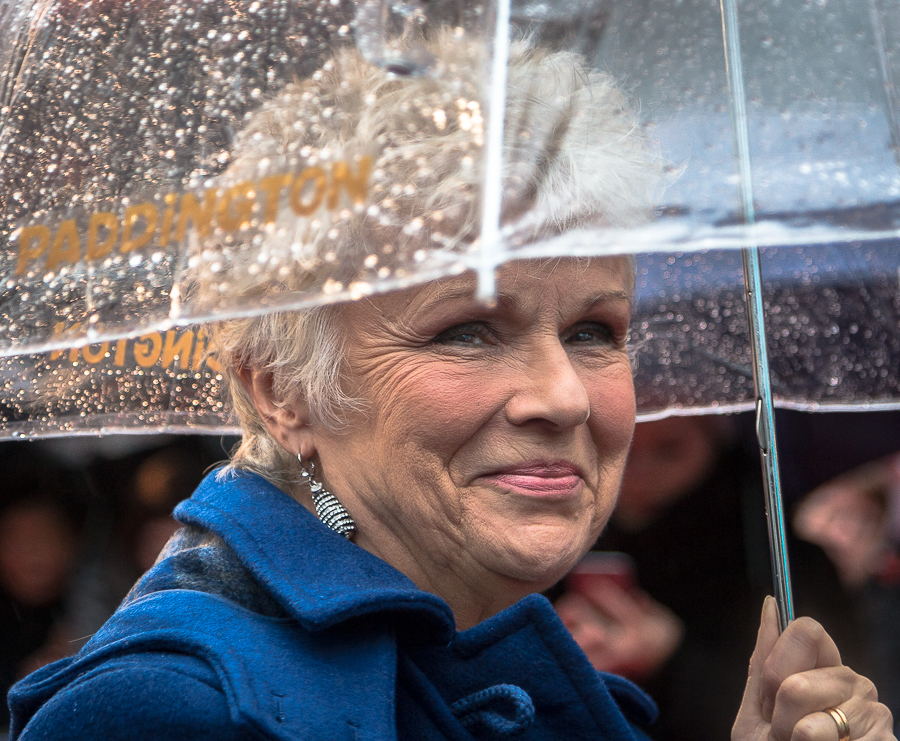
Julie Walters, Best Actress winner

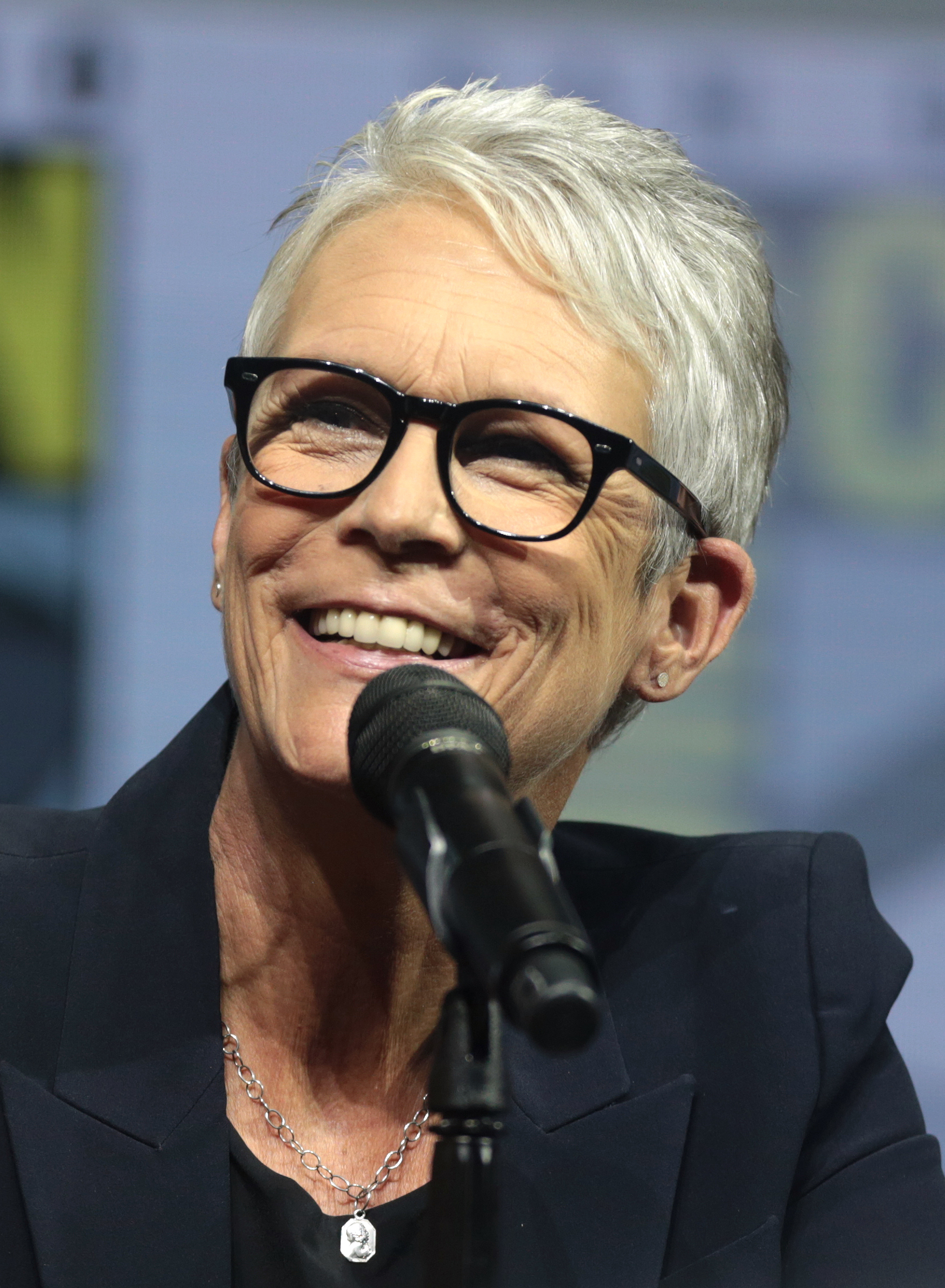
Jamie Lee Curtis, Best Supporting Actress winner

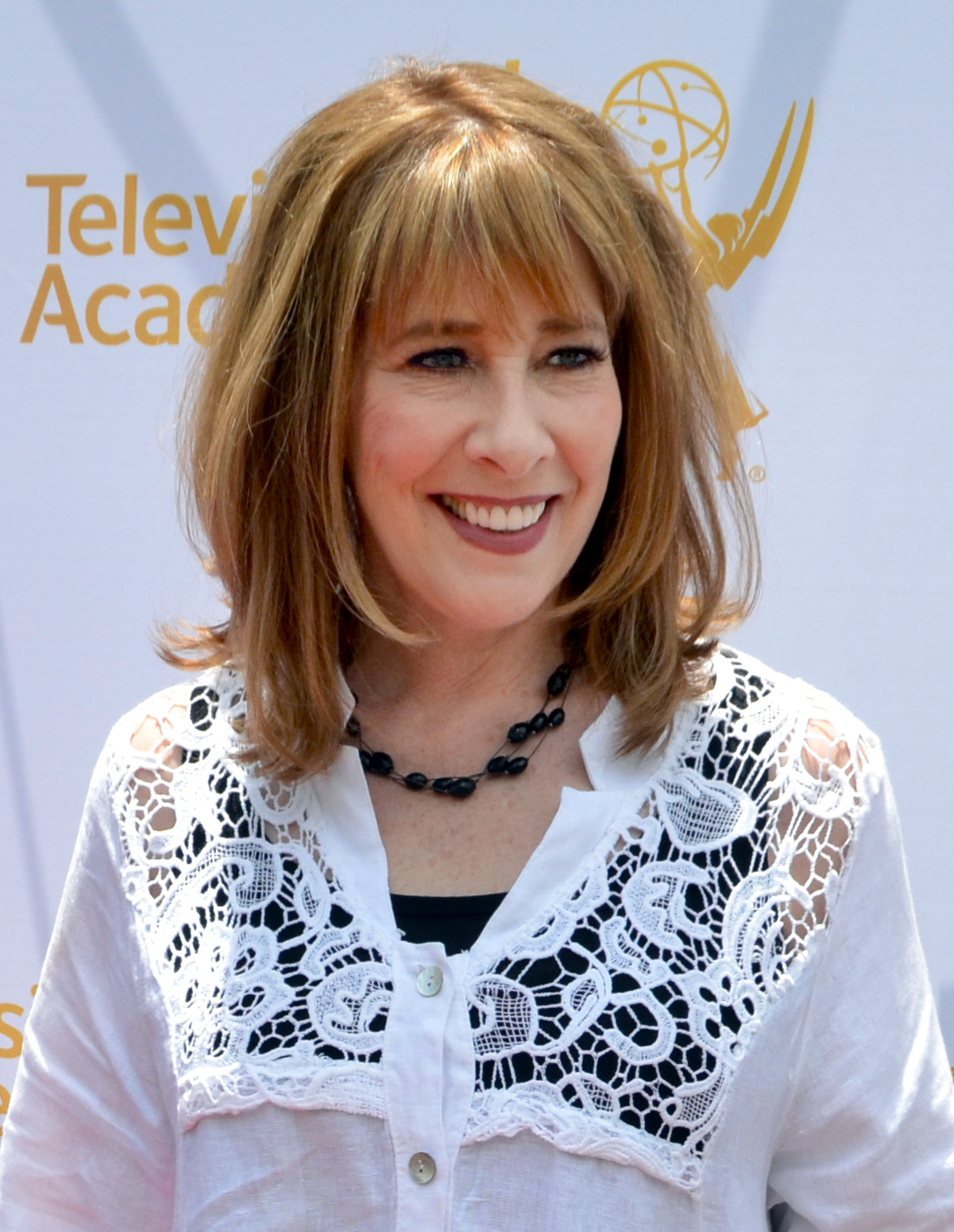
Phyllis Logan, Best Newcomer winner

=== BAFTA Fellowship ===
- **Sam Spiegel**

=== Outstanding British Contribution to Cinema ===
- **Colin Young**

=== Awards ===
Winners are listed first and highlighted in boldface.

**Best Film**: **Educating Rita – Lewis Gilbert**; Heat and Dust – Ismail Merchant; Local Hero – David Puttnam; Tootsie – Sydney Pollack and Dick Richards	**Best Direction**: **Bill Forsyth – Local Hero**; James Ivory – Heat and Dust; Sydney Pollack − Tootsie; Martin Scorsese – The King of Comedy
**Best Actor in a Leading Role**: **Dustin Hoffman – Tootsie as Michael Dorsey / Dorothy Michaels**; **Michael Caine – Educating Rita as Professor Frank Bryant**; Michael Caine – The Honorary Consul as Charley Fortnum; Robert De Niro – The King of Comedy as Rupert Pupkin	**Best Actress in a Leading Role**: **Julie Walters – Educating Rita as Susan White**; Jessica Lange – Tootsie as Julie Nichols; Phyllis Logan − Another Time, Another Place as Janie; Meryl Streep – Sophie's Choice as Zofia Zawistowski
**Best Actor in a Supporting Role**: **Denholm Elliott – Trading Places as Coleman**; Bob Hoskins – The Honorary Consul as Colonel Perez; Burt Lancaster – Local Hero as Felix Happer; Jerry Lewis – The King of Comedy as Jerry Langford	**Best Actress in a Supporting Role**: **Jamie Lee Curtis – Trading Places as Ophelia**; Teri Garr – Tootsie as Sandy Lester; Rosemary Harris – The Ploughman's Lunch as Ann Barrington; Maureen Lipman − Educating Rita as Trish
**Best Original Screenplay**: **The King of Comedy – Paul D. Zimmerman**; Local Hero – Bill Forsyth; Trading Places – Timothy Harris and Herschel Weingrod; Zelig – Woody Allen	**Best Adapted Screenplay**: **Heat and Dust – Ruth Prawer Jhabvala**; Betrayal – Harold Pinter; Educating Rita – Willy Russell; Tootsie – Larry Gelbart and Murray Schisgal
**Best Cinematography**: **Fanny and Alexander – Sven Nykvist**; Heat and Dust – Walter Lassally; Local Hero – Chris Menges; Zelig – Gordon Willis	**Best Costume Design**: **La Traviata – Piero Tosi**; Fanny and Alexander – Marik Vos-Lundh; Heat and Dust – Barbara Lane; Tootsie – Ruth Morley
**Best Editing**: **Flashdance – Bud S. Smith and Walt Mulconery**; The King of Comedy – Thelma Schoonmaker; Local Hero – Michael Bradsell; Zelig – Susan E. Morse	**Best Makeup and Hair**: **Tootsie – Dorothy Pearl, George Masters, Romaina Ford and Allen Weisinger**; Heat and Dust – Gordon Kay; Return of the Jedi – Phil Tippett and Stuart Freeborn; Zelig – Fred Buchner and John Caglione Jr.
**Best Original Music**: **Merry Christmas, Mr. Lawrence – Ryuichi Sakamoto**; Flashdance – Giorgio Moroder; Local Hero – Mark Knopfler; An Officer and a Gentleman – Jack Nitzsche	**Best Original Song**: **"Up Where We Belong" (An Officer and a Gentleman) – Jack Nitzsche, Buffy Sainte-Marie and Will Jennings**; "Flashdance... What a Feeling" (Flashdance) – Giorgio Moroder, Keith Forsey and Irene Cara; "Tootsie" (Tootsie) – Dave Grusin, Alan and Marilyn Bergman; "Every Sperm Is Sacred" (Monty Python's The Meaning of Life) – Andre Jacquemin, Dave Howman, Michael Palin and Terry Jones
**Best Production Design**: **La Traviata – Franco Zeffirelli and Gianni Quaranta**; Heat and Dust – Wilfred Shingleton; Return of the Jedi – Norman Reynolds; WarGames – Angelo P. Graham	**Best Sound**: **WarGames – Willie D. Burton, Michael J. Kohut and William Manger**; Flashdance – Jim Webb, Robert Knudson, Robert Glass and Don Digirolamo; La Traviata – Cesare D'Amico, Jean-Louis Ducarme, Claude Villand and Federico Savina; Return of the Jedi – Ben Burtt, Tony Dawe and Gary Summers
**Best Special Visual Effects**: **Return of the Jedi – Richard Edlund, Dennis Muren, Ken Ralston and Kit West**; The Dark Crystal – Roy Field, Brian Smithies and Ian Wingrove; WarGames – Mike Fink, Joe Digaetano, Jack Cooperman, Don Hansard, Colin Cantwell and William A. Fraker; Zelig – Gordon Willis, Joel Hynek, Stuart Robertson and Richard Alan Greenberg	**Most Promising Newcomer to Leading Film Roles**: **Phyllis Logan – Another Time, Another Place as Janie**; Greta Scacchi – Heat and Dust as Olivia Rivers; Julie Walters – Educating Rita as Susan White; Kevin Kline – Sophie's Choice as Nathan Landau
**Best Documentary**: **Schindler – Jon Blair**; Forty Minutes: Female Circumcision – Louise Panton; The Visit: Part 3: The Boy David – Alex McCall; Wildlife On One: Night Life – Dilys Breese	**Best Film Not in the English Language**: **Danton – Margaret Ménégoz, Barbara Pec-Slesicka and Andrzej Wajda**; Confidentially Yours – Armand Barboult and François Truffaut; Fanny and Alexander – Jörn Donner and Ingmar Bergman; La Traviata – Tarak Ben Ammar and Franco Zeffirelli
**Best Short Animation**: **Henry's Cat – Bob Godfrey**; Danger Mouse – Brian Cosgrove and Mark Hall; Paddington Goes to the Movies – Barry Leith; The Wind in the Willows – Mark Hall and Brian Cosgrove	**Best Short Film**: **Goodie Two Shoes – Ian Emes**; The Crimson Permanent Assurance – Terry Gilliam; John Love – John Davis; Keep Off the Grass – Paul Weiland

== Statistics ==
Films that received multiple nominations
Nominations	Film
9	Tootsie
8	Heat and Dust
7	Local Hero
6	Educating Rita
5	The King of Comedy
5	Zelig
4	Flashdance
4	La Traviata
4	Return of the Jedi
3	Fanny and Alexander
3	Trading Places
3	WarGames
2	Another Time, Another Place
2	The Honorary Consul
2	An Officer and a Gentleman
2	Sophie's Choice

Films that received multiple awards
Awards	Film
3	Educating Rita
2	La Traviata
2	Tootsie
2	Trading Places

== See also ==
- 56th Academy Awards
- 9th César Awards
- 36th Directors Guild of America Awards
- 41st Golden Globe Awards
- 4th Golden Raspberry Awards
- 10th Saturn Awards
- 36th Writers Guild of America Awards
