= The Householder =

- DVD cover art
- Directed by: James Ivory
- Screenplay by: Ruth Prawer Jhabvala; James Ivory
- Based on: The Householder by Ruth Prawer Jhabvala
- Produced by: Ismail Merchant
- Starring: Shashi Kapoor; Leela Naidu; Durga Khote
- Cinematography: Subrata Mitra
- Edited by: Raja Ram Khetle
- Music by: Songs: Ustad Ali Akbar Khan; Background Score: Vanraj Bhatia
- Color process: Black & white
- Distributed by: Columbia Pictures
- Release date: 1963
- Running time: 101 minutes
- Country: India
- Languages: English; Hindi
- Budget: $125,000

The Householder (Hindi title: Gharbar) is a 1963 film by Merchant Ivory Productions, with direction by James Ivory (in his feature directorial debut) and a screenplay by Ivory and Ruth Prawer Jhabvala. It is based upon the 1960 novel of the same name by Jhabvala.

This was the first collaboration between producer Ismail Merchant and director James Ivory, a documentary filmmaker until then. They went on to make nearly forty films together, many of which were written by Ruth Prawer Jhabvala, who also wrote screenplays adapted from literary classics for them, such as Henry James' The Europeans (1979) and The Bostonians (1984), E. M. Forster's A Room with a View (1985) and Howards End (1992), and Peter Cameron's The City of Your Final Destination (2009).

== Synopsis ==
Prem Sagar (Shashi Kapoor), a teacher at a private college in Delhi, marries Indu (Leela Naidu) in an arranged marriage and is still learning his role in the marriage, when the arrival of his mother (Durga Khote) spells doom to their budding relationship. Indu, unable to handle his mother's interference in the marriage, leaves Prem to return to her family. Prem searches for answers from a variety of people, including a Swami (Pahari Sanyal), who reveals the secret to a successful marriage, and as a result, Prem finally gains the maturity to love his wife.

== Cast ==
- Shashi Kapoor - Prem Sagar
- Leela Naidu - Indu
- Durga Khote - Prem's mother
- Achala Sachdev - Mrs. Saigal
- Harindranath Chattopadhyay -Mr. Chadda
- Pratap Chandra Sen - Sohanlal
- Romesh Thapar - Mr. Khanna (The Principal)
- Indu Lele - Mrs. Khanna
- Pinchoo Kapoor - Mr. Saigal
- Prayag Raaj - Raj
- Shama Beg - Mrs. Raj
- Patsy Dance - Kitty
- Walter King - Professor
- Ernest Castaldo - Ernest
- Pahari Sanyal - Swami

== Production ==
Ivory had shot the documentary The Delhi Way and was editing it in New York, when he met anthropologist Gitel Steed, who was developing a project based on her screenplay, Devgar about a village in Gujarat. Ismail Merchant was producing the film and had started getting together the finances for the film. Sidney Meyers was the director, while Ivory agreed to shoot the film, whose cast included Shashi Kapoor, Durga Khote and Leela Naidu. When the film fell through due to lack of complete financing, Merchant suggested the idea of The Householder, and the same cast was used. The film cost $125,000, with some of the money Ivory had borrowed from his father. It was made in two versions, Hindi and English, the latter was picked up for distribution in the United Kingdom by Columbia Pictures.

Shooting for the film started in 1961 and was completed in 1963. The film was shot entirely on location in Delhi, Mehrauli and Ghaziabad. Satyajit Ray exerted an important influence both on Ivory and Merchant, as well as on this film. In an uncredited assist, he supervised the film's music production and re-cut the film for Merchant and Ivory. He also lent his cameraman, Subrata Mitra, as the director of photography, and as a result the film is infused with the fluid, restrained lyricism that characterizes Ray's work.

An interesting feature of this film was the use of background music which included Hindi/Urdu songs such as "Chahe koi mujhe junglee kahe" (singer Mohammed Rafi from the film Junglee), "Jiya ho Jiya kuch bol do" (Lata Mangeshkar from the film Jab Pyar Kisi Se Hota Hai, 1961) and also movement IV from Symphony No. 9 (Beethoven), with only one on screen spiritual song (bhajan) "Ram dar se jab paeyo". This went against the traditional structure of contemporary Hindi films being by and large musicals featuring playback singing.

== Crew ==
- Music: Ustad Ali Akbar Khan
- Incidental music
  - Jyotirendera Moitra
  - Vanraj Bhatia
- Costume design - Bettina Gill
- Production - Bhanu Ghosh
- Hindi dialogue - R.G. Anand

== Reception ==
A Channel 4 review called it "a low-key but rewarding character piece" and "an artful social satire and also a quietly affecting love story", while The New York Times was dismissive. Mike Clark of USA Today called it: "...A charming comedy of marital discord...", gave it, 3 1/2 out of 4 stars.
