= 59th Academy Awards =

- Official poster
- Date: March 30, 1987
- Site: Dorothy Chandler Pavilion; Los Angeles, California, U.S.
- Hosted by: Chevy Chase, Goldie Hawn and Paul Hogan
- Produced by: Samuel Goldwyn Jr.
- Directed by: Marty Pasetta

Highlights
- Best Picture: Platoon
- Most awards: Platoon (4)
- Most nominations: Platoon and A Room with a View (8)

TV in the United States
- Network: ABC
- Duration: 3 hours, 25 minutes
- Ratings: 37.19 million 27.5% (Nielsen ratings)

The 59th Academy Awards ceremony, organized by the Academy of Motion Picture Arts and Sciences (AMPAS), took place on March 30, 1987, at the Dorothy Chandler Pavilion in Los Angeles beginning at 6:00 p.m. PST / 9:00 p.m. EST. During the ceremony, AMPAS presented Academy Awards (commonly referred to as Oscars) in 23 categories honoring films released in 1986. The ceremony, televised in the United States by ABC, was produced by Samuel Goldwyn Jr. and directed by Marty Pasetta. Actors Chevy Chase, Paul Hogan, and Goldie Hawn co-hosted the show. Hawn hosted the gala for the second time, having previously been a co-host of the 48th ceremony held in 1976. Meanwhile, this was Chase and Hogan's first Oscar-hosting stint. Eight days earlier, in a ceremony held at The Beverly Hilton in Beverly Hills, California, on March 22, the Academy Awards for Technical Achievement were presented by host Catherine Hicks.

Platoon won four awards, including Best Picture. Other winners included Hannah and Her Sisters and A Room with a View with three awards, Aliens with two, and Artie Shaw: Time Is All You've Got, The Assault, Children of a Lesser God, The Color of Money, Down and Out in America, The Fly, A Greek Tragedy, The Mission, Precious Images, Round Midnight, Top Gun, and Women – for America, for the World with one.

== Winners and nominees ==
The nominees for the 59th Academy Awards were announced on February 11, 1987, at the Samuel Goldwyn Theater in Beverly Hills, California, by Robert Wise, president of the Academy, actor Don Ameche, and actress Anjelica Huston. Platoon and A Room with a View led all nominees with eight each.

The winners were announced during the awards ceremony on March 30, 1987. Marlee Matlin was the first deaf performer to win an Oscar and the youngest winner in the Best Actress category. Best Actor winner Paul Newman was the fourth actor to have been nominated for portraying the same character in two different films, having previously earned a nomination for his role as "Fast Eddie" Felson in 1961's The Hustler. By virtue of his victory in the Best Actor category, Newman and wife Joanne Woodward, who won Best Actress for her performance in 1957's The Three Faces of Eve, became the second married couple to win acting Oscars. Artie Shaw: Time Is All You've Got and Down and Out in America's joint win in the Best Documentary Feature category marked the fourth occurrence of a tie in Oscar history.

=== Awards ===
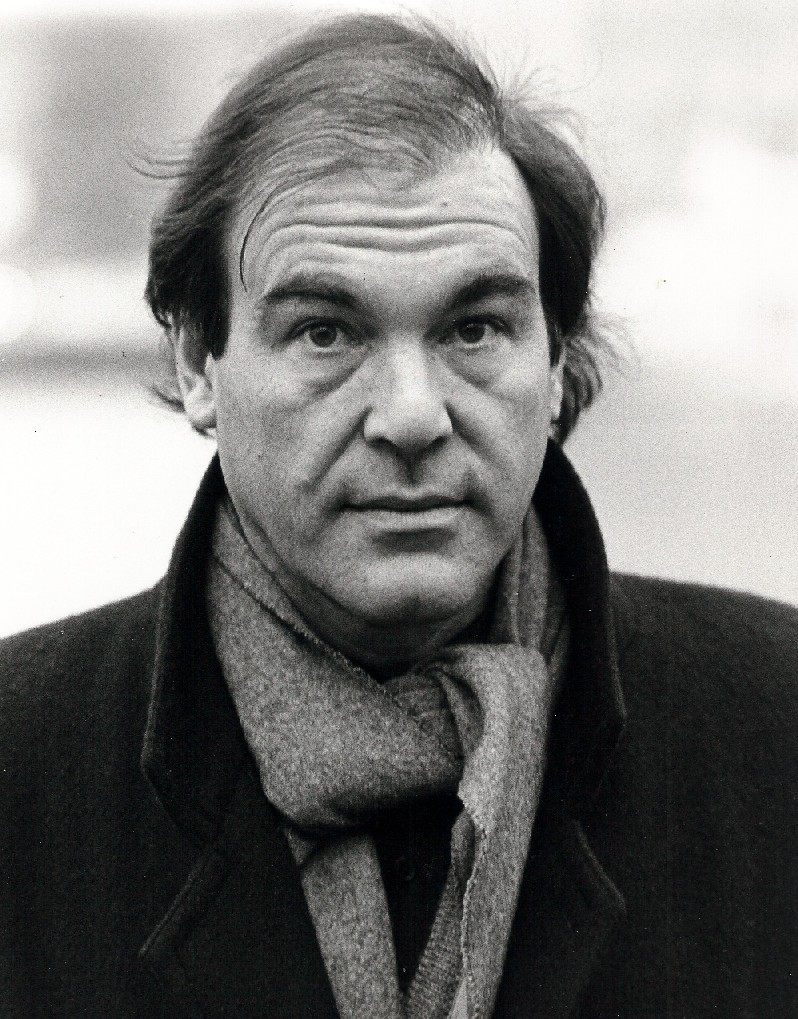
Oliver Stone, Best Director winner

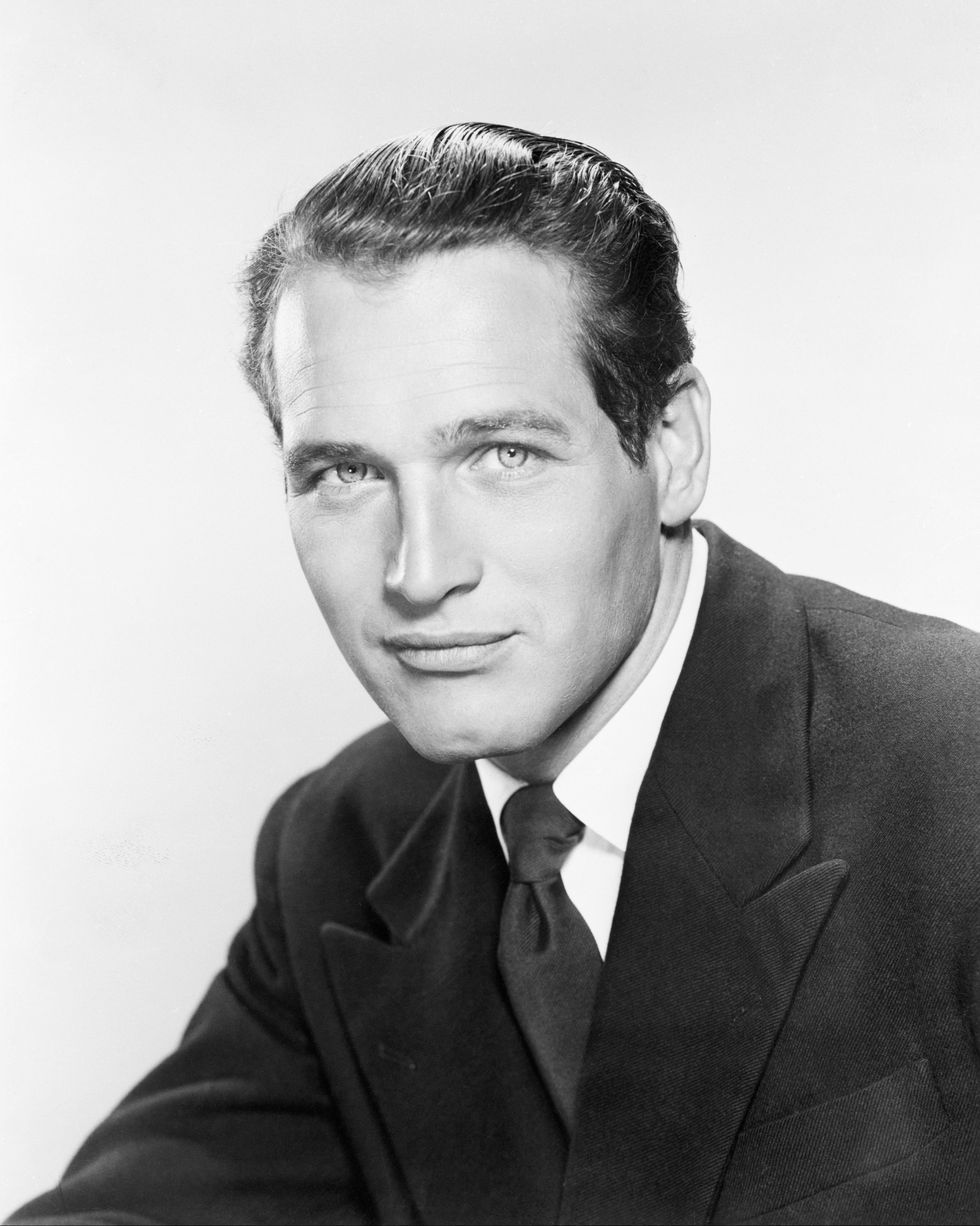
Paul Newman, Best Actor winner

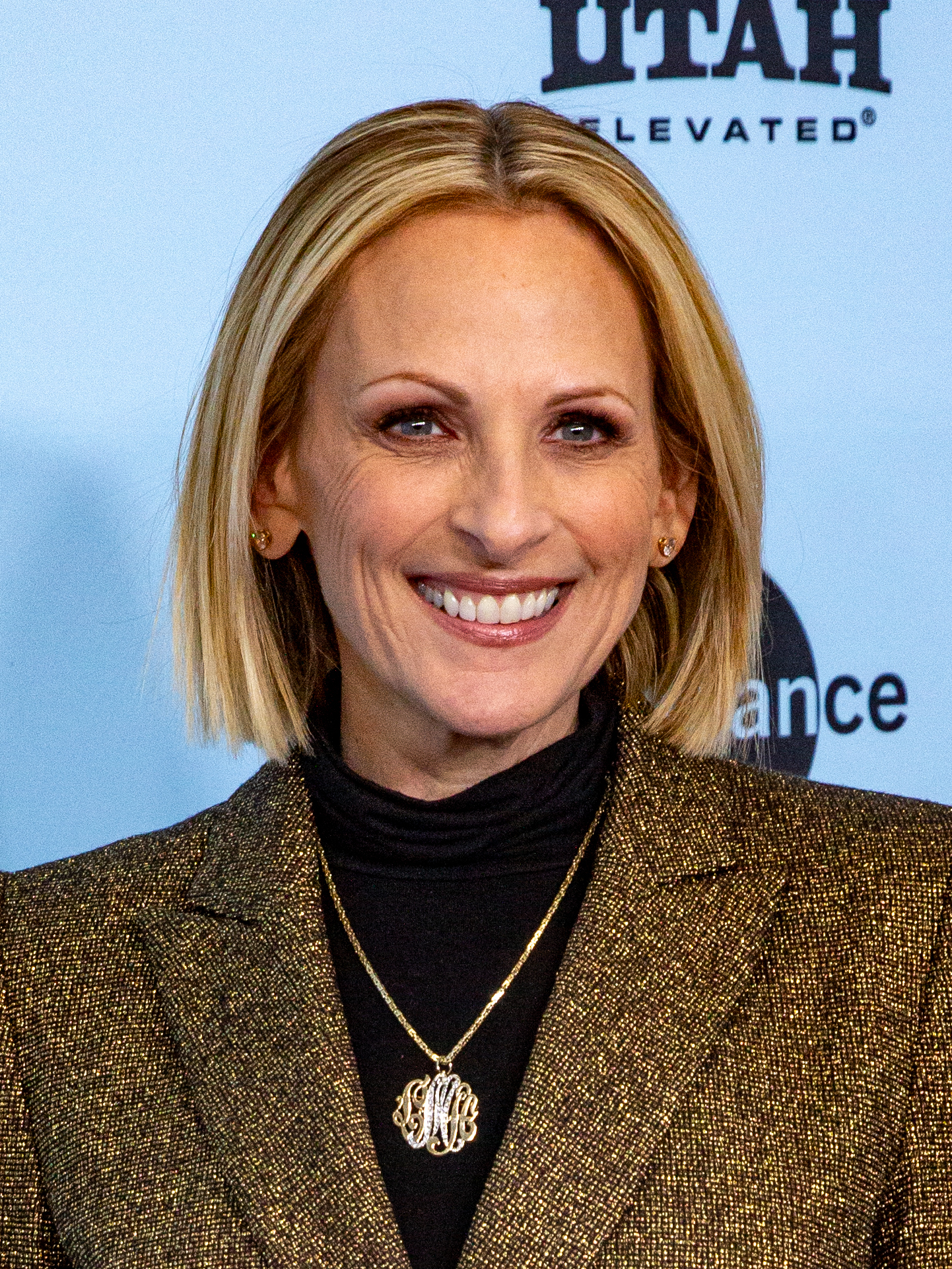
Marlee Matlin, Best Actress winner

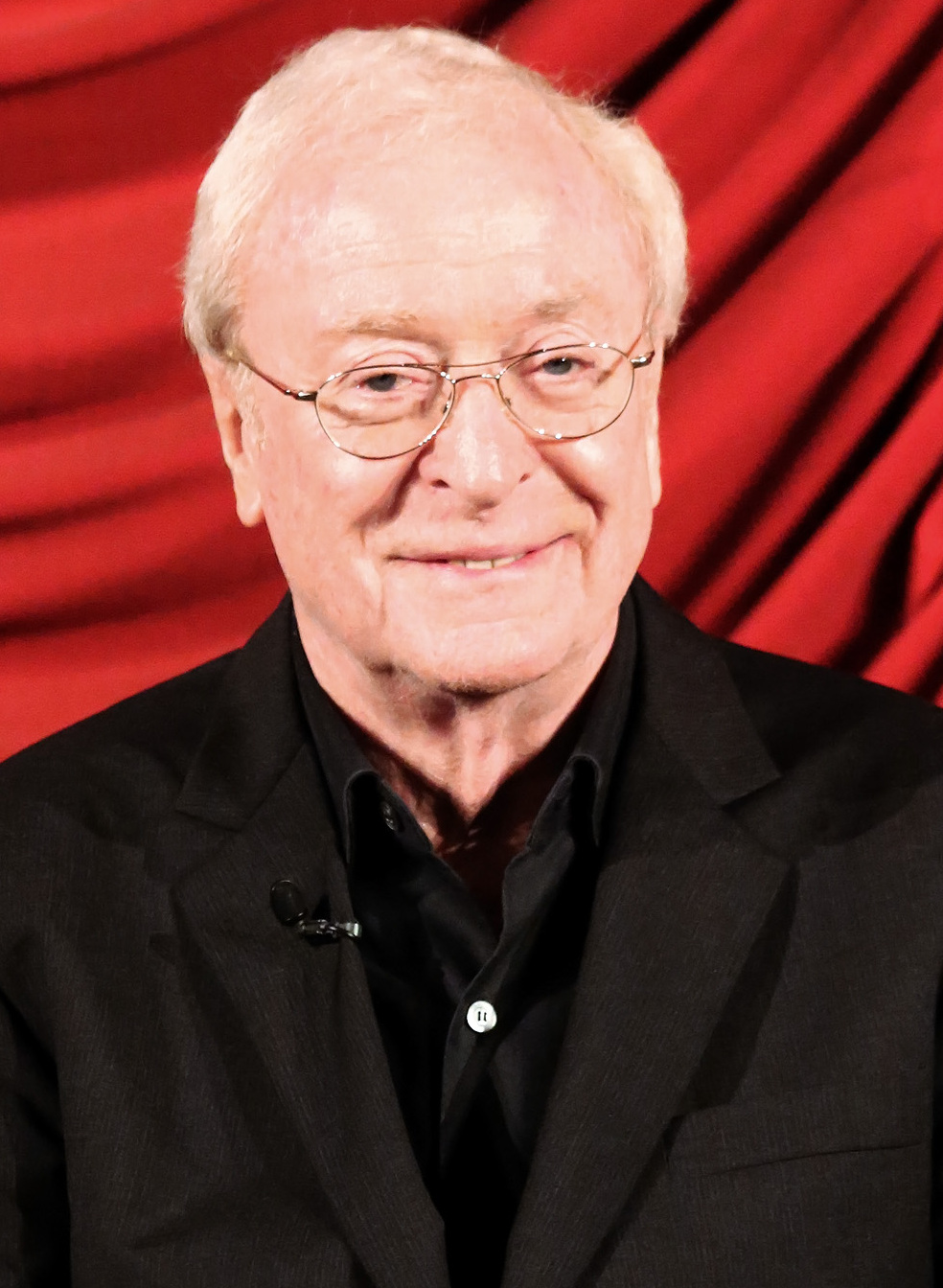
Michael Caine, Best Supporting Actor winner

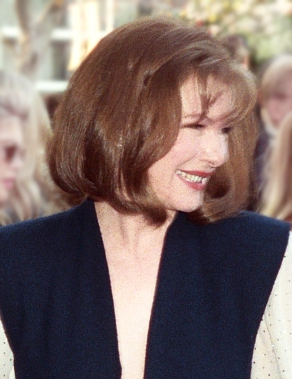
Dianne Wiest, Best Supporting Actress winner

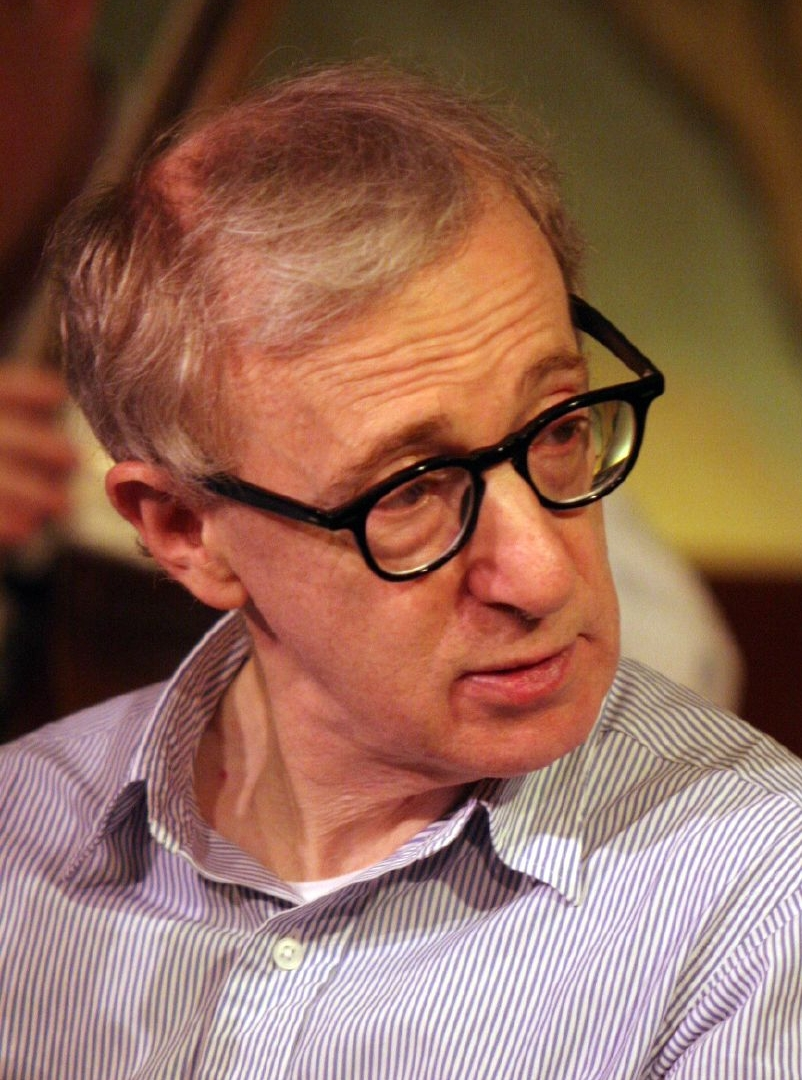
Woody Allen, Best Original Screenplay winner

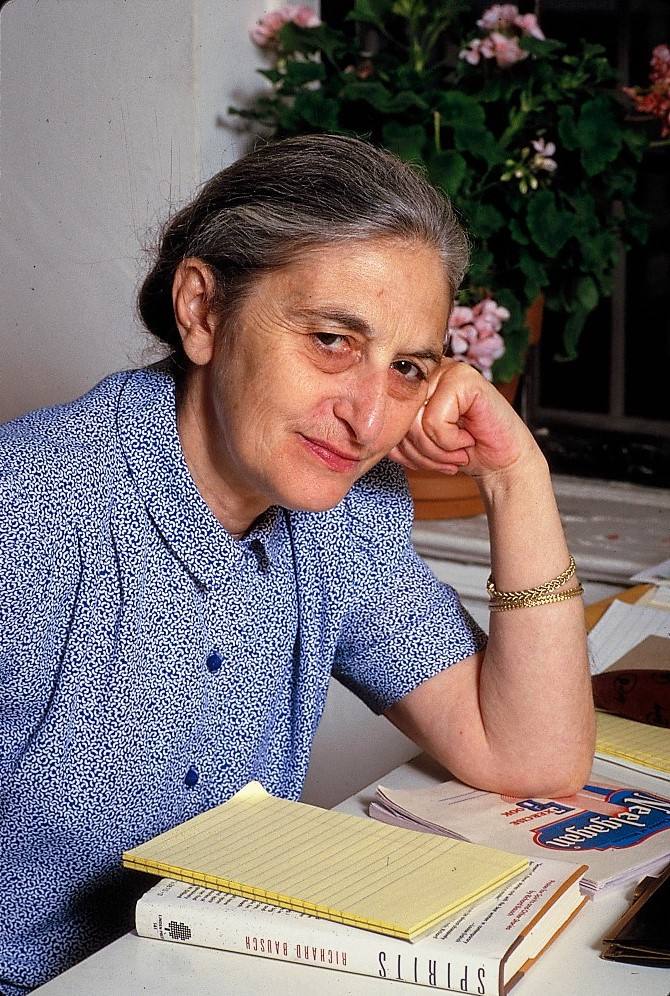
Ruth Prawer Jhabvala, Best Adapted Screenplay winner

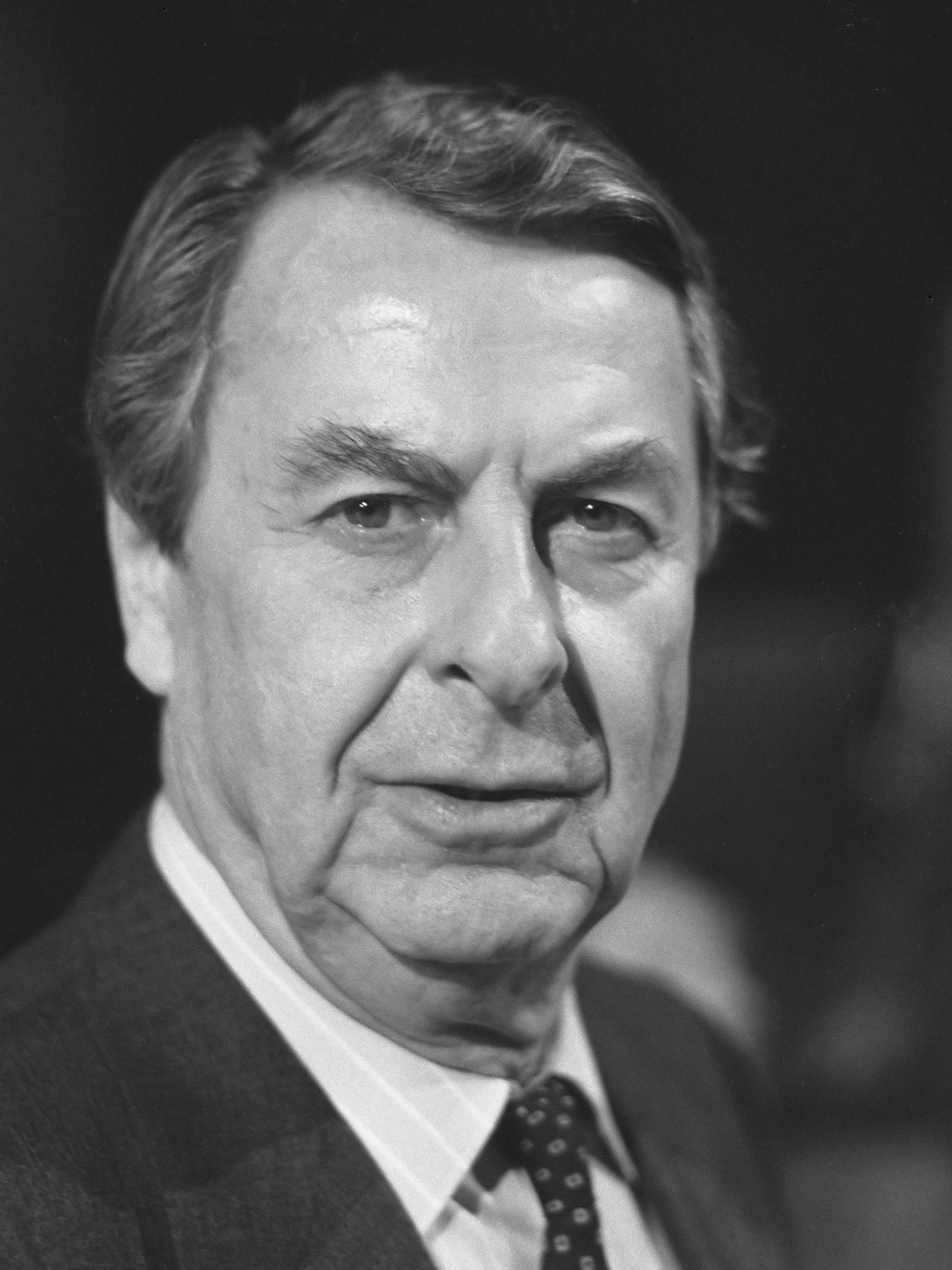
Fons Rademakers, Best Foreign Language Film winner

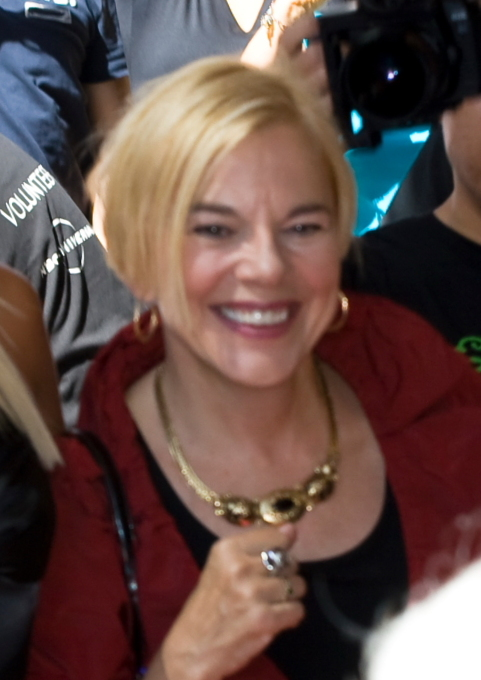
Brigitte Berman, Best Documentary Feature winner

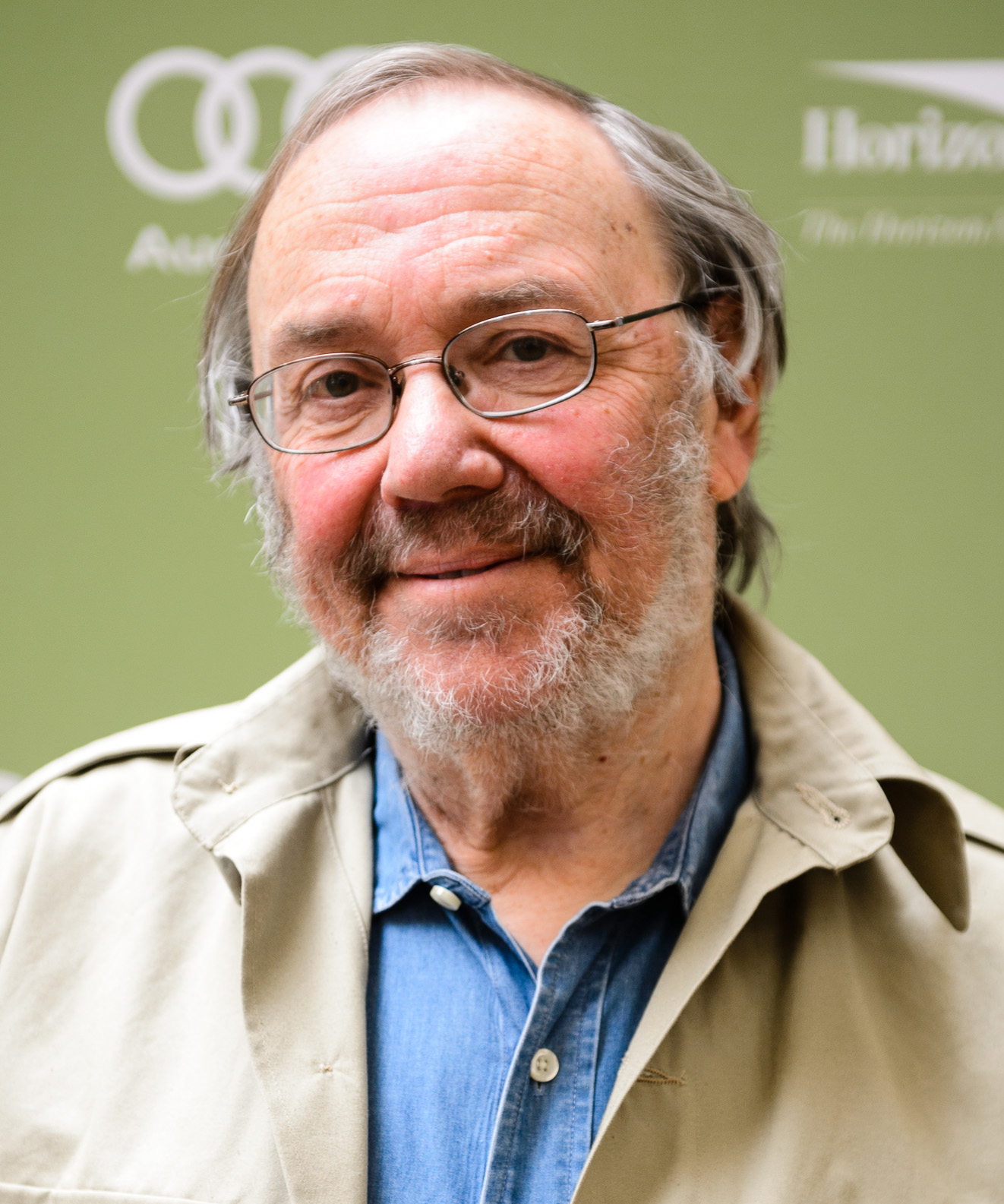
Chuck Workman, Best Live Action Short Film winner

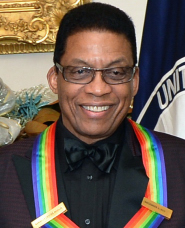
Herbie Hancock, Best Original Score winner

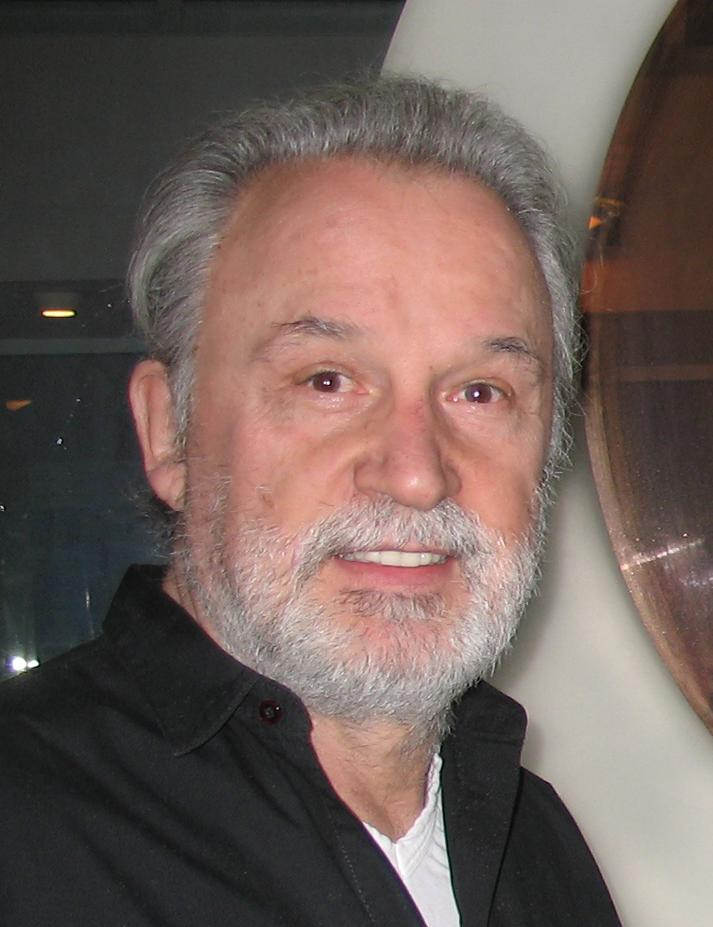
Giorgio Moroder, Best Original Song co-winner

Winners are listed first, highlighted in boldface and indicated with a double dagger (‡).

**Best Picture**: **Platoon – Arnold Kopelson, producer**‡; Children of a Lesser God – Burt Sugarman and Patrick J. Palmer, producers; Hannah and Her Sisters – Robert Greenhut, producer; The Mission – Fernando Ghia and David Puttnam, producers; A Room with a View – Ismail Merchant, producer	**Best Directing**: **Oliver Stone – Platoon**‡; David Lynch – Blue Velvet; Woody Allen – Hannah and Her Sisters; Roland Joffé – The Mission; James Ivory – A Room with a View
**Best Actor in a Leading Role**: **Paul Newman – The Color of Money as "Fast Eddie" Felson**‡; Dexter Gordon – Round Midnight as Dale Turner; Bob Hoskins – Mona Lisa as George; William Hurt – Children of a Lesser God as James Leeds; James Woods – Salvador as Richard Boyle	**Best Actress in a Leading Role**: **Marlee Matlin – Children of a Lesser God as Sarah Norman**‡; Jane Fonda – The Morning After as Alex Sternbergen; Sissy Spacek – Crimes of the Heart as Babe Magrath; Kathleen Turner – Peggy Sue Got Married as Peggy Sue Bodell; Sigourney Weaver – Aliens as Ellen Ripley
**Best Actor in a Supporting Role**: **Michael Caine – Hannah and Her Sisters as Elliot**‡; Tom Berenger – Platoon as Sgt. Bob Barnes; Willem Dafoe – Platoon as Sgt. Elias Grodin; Denholm Elliott – A Room with a View as Mr. Emerson; Dennis Hopper – Hoosiers as Wilbur "Shooter" Flatch	**Best Actress in a Supporting Role**: **Dianne Wiest – Hannah and Her Sisters as Holly**‡; Tess Harper – Crimes of the Heart as Chick Boyle; Piper Laurie – Children of a Lesser God as Mrs. Norman; Mary Elizabeth Mastrantonio – The Color of Money as Carmen; Maggie Smith – A Room with a View as Charlotte Bartlett
**Best Writing (Screenplay Written Directly for the Screen)**: **Hannah and Her Sisters – Woody Allen**‡; Crocodile Dundee – Screenplay by Paul Hogan, Ken Shadie, and John Cornell; Story by Paul Hogan; My Beautiful Laundrette – Hanif Kureishi; Platoon – Oliver Stone; Salvador – Oliver Stone and Richard Boyle	**Best Writing (Screenplay Based on Material from Another Medium)**: **A Room with a View – Ruth Prawer Jhabvala based on the novel by E. M. Forster**‡; Children of a Lesser God – Hesper Anderson and Mark Medoff based on the play by Mark Medoff; The Color of Money – Richard Price based on the novel by Walter Tevis; Crimes of the Heart – Beth Henley based on her play; Stand by Me – Raynold Gideon and Bruce A. Evans based on the novella The Body by Stephen King
**Best Foreign Language Film**: **The Assault (The Netherlands) in Dutch and German – Fons Rademakers**‡; 38 (Austria) in German – Wolfgang Glück; Betty Blue (France) in French – Jean-Jacques Beineix; The Decline of the American Empire (Canada) in French – Denys Arcand; My Sweet Little Village (Czechoslovakia) in Czech – Jiří Menzel	**Best Documentary (Feature)**: **Artie Shaw: Time Is All You've Got – Brigitte Berman**‡; **Down and Out in America – Joseph Feury and Milton Justice**‡; Chile: Hasta Cuando? – David Bradbury; Isaac in America: A Journey with Isaac Bashevis Singer – Kirk Simon and Amram Nowak; Witness to Apartheid – Sharon I. Sopher
**Best Documentary (Short Subject)**: **Women – for America, for the World – Vivienne Verdon-Roe**‡; Debonair Dancers – Alison Nigh-Strelich; The Masters of Disaster – Sonya Friedman; Red Grooms: Sunflower in a Hothouse – Thomas L. Neff and Madeline Bell; Sam – Aaron D. Weisblatt	**Best Short Film (Live Action)**: **Precious Images – Chuck Workman**‡; Exit – Stefano Reali and Pino Quartullo; Love Struck – Fredda Weiss
**Best Short Film (Animated)**: **Greek Tragedy – Linda Van Tulden and Willem Thijssen** ‡; The Frog, the Dog and the Devil – Bob Stenhouse; Luxo Jr. – John Lasseter and William Reeves	**Best Music (Original Score)**: **Round Midnight – Herbie Hancock**‡; Aliens – James Horner; Hoosiers – Jerry Goldsmith; The Mission – Ennio Morricone; Star Trek IV: The Voyage Home – Leonard Rosenman
**Best Music (Original Song)**: **"Take My Breath Away" from Top Gun – Music and Lyrics by Giorgio Moroder and Tom Whitlock**‡; "Glory of Love" from The Karate Kid Part II – Music by Peter Cetera and David Foster; Lyrics by Peter Cetera and Diane Nini; "Life in a Looking Glass" from That's Life! – Music by Henry Mancini; Lyrics by Leslie Bricusse; "Mean Green Mother from Outer Space" from Little Shop of Horrors – Music by Alan Menken; Lyrics by Howard Ashman; "Somewhere Out There" from An American Tail – Music by James Horner and Barry Mann; Lyrics by Cynthia Weil	**Best Sound**: **Platoon – John K. Wilkinson, Richard Rogers, Charles "Bud" Grenzbach, and Simon Kaye**‡; Aliens – Graham V. Hartstone, Nicolas Le Messurier, Michael A. Carter, and Roy Charman; Heartbreak Ridge – Les Fresholtz, Dick Alexander, Vern Poore, and William Nelson; Star Trek IV: The Voyage Home – Terry Porter, Dave Hudson, Mel Metcalfe, and Gene S. Cantamessa; Top Gun – Donald O. Mitchell, Kevin O'Connell, Rick Kline, and William B. Kaplan
**Best Sound Effects Editing**: **Aliens – Don Sharpe**‡; Star Trek IV: The Voyage Home – Mark Mangini; Top Gun – Cecelia Hall and George Watters II	**Best Art Direction**: **A Room with a View – Art Direction: Gianni Quaranta and Brian Ackland-Snow; Set Decoration: Brian Savegar and Elio Altramura**‡; Aliens – Art Direction: Peter Lamont; Set Decoration: Crispian Sallis; The Color of Money – Art Direction: Boris Leven (posthumous nomination); Set Decoration: Karen O'Hara; Hannah and Her Sisters – Art Direction: Stuart Wurtzel; Set Decoration: Carol Joffe; The Mission – Art Direction: Stuart Craig; Set Decoration: Jack Stephens
**Best Cinematography**: **The Mission – Chris Menges**‡; Peggy Sue Got Married – Jordan Cronenweth; Platoon – Robert Richardson; A Room with a View – Tony Pierce-Roberts; Star Trek IV: The Voyage Home – Donald Peterman	**Best Makeup**: **The Fly – Chris Walas and Stephan Dupuis**‡; The Clan of the Cave Bear – Michael Westmore and Michèle Burke; Legend – Rob Bottin and Peter Robb-King
**Best Costume Design**: **A Room with a View – Jenny Beavan and John Bright**‡; The Mission – Enrico Sabbatini; Otello – Anna Anni and Maurizio Millenotti; Peggy Sue Got Married – Theadora Van Runkle; Pirates – Anthony Powell	**Best Film Editing**: **Platoon – Claire Simpson**‡; Aliens – Ray Lovejoy; Hannah and Her Sisters – Susan E. Morse; The Mission – Jim Clark; Top Gun – Billy Weber and Chris Lebenzon
**Best Visual Effects**: **Aliens – Robert Skotak, Stan Winston, John Richardson, and Suzanne M. Benson**‡; Little Shop of Horrors – Lyle Conway, Bran Ferren, and Martin Gutteridge; Poltergeist II: The Other Side – Richard Edlund, John Bruno, Garry Waller, and William Neil

=== Honorary Award ===
- To Ralph Bellamy for his unique artistry and his distinguished service to the profession of acting.

=== Irving G. Thalberg Memorial Award ===
- Steven Spielberg

=== Multiple nominations and awards ===
The following 15 films had multiple nominations:

Nominations	Film
8	Platoon
8	A Room with a View
7	Aliens
7	Hannah and Her Sisters
7	The Mission
5	Children of a Lesser God
4	The Color of Money
4	Star Trek IV: The Voyage Home
4	Top Gun
3	Crimes of the Heart
3	Peggy Sue Got Married
2	Hoosiers
2	Little Shop of Horrors
2	Round Midnight
2	Salvador

The following four films received multiple awards.

Awards	Film
4	Platoon
3	Hannah and Her Sisters
3	A Room with a View
2	Aliens

== Presenters and performers ==
The following individuals presented awards or performed musical numbers.

=== Presenters ===
Name(s)	Role
Hank Simms	Announcer for the 59th annual Academy Awards
Robert Wise (AMPAS president)	Gave opening remarks welcoming guests to the awards ceremony
Shirley MacLaine	Presenter of the awards for Best Adapted Screenplay and Best Original Screenplay
Marlee Matlin	Presenter of the award for Best Sound
Don Ameche; Anjelica Huston	Presenters of the award for Best Supporting Actress
Chevy Chase	Presenter of the award for Best Sound Effects Editing
Lauren Bacall	Presenter of the award for Best Costume Design
Christopher Reeve; Isabella Rossellini	Presenters of the award for Best Art Direction
Jennifer Jones	Presenter of the award for Best Cinematography
Helena Bonham Carter; Matthew Broderick	Presenters of the award for Best Documentary Short Subject
Richard Dreyfuss	Presenter of the Irving G. Thalberg Memorial Award to Steven Spielberg
Leonard Nimoy; William Shatner	Presenters of the award for Best Visual Effects
Oprah Winfrey	Presenter of the award for Best Documentary Feature
Jeff Bridges; Sigourney Weaver	Presenters of the award for Best Supporting Actor
Bernadette Peters	Presenter of the award for Best Original Song
Bette Midler	Presenter of the award for Best Original Score
Bugs Bunny; Tom Hanks	Presentations of the award for Best Animated Short Film
Rodney Dangerfield	Presenter of the award for Best Makeup
Sônia Braga; Michael Douglas	Presenters of the award for Best Live Action Short Film
William Hurt	Presenter of the award for Best Actress
Molly Ringwald	Presenter of the award for Best Film Editing
Anthony Quinn	Presenter of the award for Best Foreign Language Film
Karl Malden	Presenter of the Honorary Academy Award to Ralph Bellamy
Elizabeth Taylor	Presenter of the award for Best Director
Bette Davis	Presenter of the award for Best Actor
Dustin Hoffman	Presenter of the award for Best Picture

=== Performers ===
Name(s)	Role	Performed
Lionel Newman	Musical arranger and Conductor	Orchestral
Academy Awards chorus Dom DeLuise; Pat Morita; Telly Savalas	Performers	"Fugue for Tinhorns" from Guys and Dolls
Bernadette Peters	Performer	Sang brief introductions to each nominee for Best Original Song
Natalie Cole; James Ingram	Performers	"Somewhere Out There" from An American Tail
Peter Cetera	Performer	"Glory of Love" from The Karate Kid, Part II
Melba Moore; Lou Rawls	Performers	"Take My Breath Away" from Top Gun
Tony Bennett	Performer	"Life in a Looking Glass" from That's Life!
Levi Stubbs	Performer	"Mean Green Mother from Outer Space" from Little Shop of Horrors
Lisa Sturz	Performer	Audrey II puppet from Little Shop of Horrors
Academy Awards chorus	Performers	"Fugue for Tinhorns" during the closing credits

== Ceremony information ==
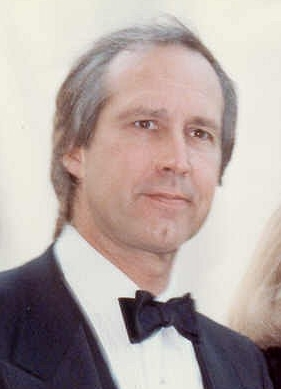
Chevy Chase (left) and Goldie Hawn (right) co-hosted the 59th Academy Awards, along with Paul Hogan (not pictured)

Determined to revive interest surrounding the awards and reverse declining ratings, the Academy hired Samuel Goldwyn Jr. in November 1986 to produce the telecast for the first time. The following March, Goldwyn announced that comedian Chevy Chase, actress and Academy Award winner Goldie Hawn, and actor and Best Original Screenplay nominee Paul Hogan would share co-hosting duties for the 1987 ceremony. Actor Robin Williams was initially named a co-host, but he was forced to withdraw from emceeing duties due to his commitment toward his role in the upcoming film Good Morning, Vietnam.

One of the biggest priorities for Goldwyn was to shorten the length of the show to at least three hours or less. In view of his goal, he told reporters regarding the winners' acceptance speeches, "We are actually going to give them 45 seconds. The light (next to the camera) will start blinking at 45 seconds and go red at 55 seconds. After one minute, we will either cut to a commercial or go to something else. We've also asked multiple winners to flip a coin and pick a spokesman." Furthermore, instead of each Best Original Song nominee being performed separately, all five songs were performed as part of a musical number featuring actress Bernadette Peters singing brief introductions to each one. Although Goldwyn attempted to move the Documentary and Short Film Categories to a separate ceremony from the broadcast, the AMPAS Board of Governors refused to do so.

Several other people were involved with the production of the ceremony. Oscar-winning costume designer Theoni V. Aldredge was hired as a fashion consultant for the awards ceremony and supervised a "fashion show" segment showcasing the five nominees for Best Costume Design. Lionel Newman served as musical director and conductor for the ceremony. Actors Dom DeLuise, Pat Morita, and Telly Savalas performed the song "Fugue for Tinhorns" from the musical Guys and Dolls at the start of the ceremony.

=== Box office performance of nominated films ===
At the time of the nominations announcement on February 11, the combined gross of the five Best Picture nominees at the US box office was $119 million, with an average of $23.9 million. Platoon was the highest earner among the Best Picture nominees, with $39.3 million in domestic box office receipts. The film was followed by Hannah and Her Sisters ($35.4 million), Children of a Lesser God ($22.1 million), A Room with a View ($11.5 million), and The Mission ($11.1 million).

Of the fifty top-grossing movies of the year, fifty-five nominations went to eighteen films on the list. Only Crocodile Dundee (2nd), Aliens (6th), The Color of Money (11th), Stand By Me (12th), Peggy Sue Got Married (18th), Platoon (23rd), Hannah and Her Sisters (29th), The Morning After (38th), The Color of Money (40th), and Crimes of the Heart (43rd) were nominated for Best Picture, directing, acting, or screenplay. The other top fifty box office hits that earned nominations were Top Gun (1st), The Karate Kid Part II (3rd), Star Trek IV: The Voyage Home (4th), An American Tail (5th), Heartbreak Ridge (17th), Poltergeist II: The Other Side (19th), The Fly (22nd), and Little Shop of Horrors (30th).

=== Critical reviews ===
The show received a mixed reception from media publications. Some media outlets were more critical of the show. Columnist Jerry Roberts of the Daily Breeze remarked, "The whole mess was like some kind of geek show from a carnival row that had incestuously multiplied itself into a gargantuan sequin-lined ego battle royal accompanied by a firestorm of ballyhooing." Despite Chase and Hawn's best efforts to liven up the broadcast, he commented, "The lumbering procedure completely defeated them." Television critic Tom Shales of The Washington Post wrote, "As usual, the Academy Awards show was marked by missed cues, noisy moving scenery, plunging necklines, inane scripted chatter and, as has often happened in recent years, few galvanizing or gratifying surprises." He also quipped that the segment showcasing the Best Costume Design nominees slowed down the ceremony's pace. The Philadelphia Inquirer's film critic Carrie Rickey observed, "As pace goes, the Academy Awards show was like watching a race between slugs and snails." She later wrote, "Oscarsclerosis is the show's most critical condition, the result of a telecast larded, once again, with too many Vegas-style production numbers."

Other media outlets received the broadcast more positively. Film critic John Hartl of The Seattle Times noted that the ceremony "was well-paced and filled with comics and comic film clips." He also complimented producer Goldwyn for hiring comics, including host Chase, and presenters such as Rodney Dangerfield for helping "to keep the show light and funny." The New York Times columnist Janet Maslin wrote, "This was the trimmest, most varied and best-paced program in years." She also commented that without the witty banter of hosts Hogan and Chase, "The show would have seemed notably lacking in luster." Television editor Michael Burkett of the Orange County Register commented, "Monday night's 59th installment was very nearly everything you could have wished it to be: quite entertaining, relatively fast-moving, unusually short on tastelessness and tackiness drenched in nostalgia, and featuring enough superbly chosen film clips for a monster round of Visual Trivial Pursuit.

=== Ratings and reception ===
The American telecast on ABC drew in an average of 37.19 million people over its length, which was a 2% decrease from the previous year's ceremony. However, the show drew higher Nielsen ratings compared to the previous ceremony, with 27.5% of households watching over a 43 share. Many media outlets pointed out that the broadcast earned higher ratings compared to the final game of the 1987 NCAA Men's Division I Basketball Tournament which was airing on CBS that same night.

== See also ==
- 7th Golden Raspberry Awards
- 29th Grammy Awards
- 39th Primetime Emmy Awards
- 40th British Academy Film Awards
- 41st Tony Awards
- 44th Golden Globe Awards
- List of submissions to the 59th Academy Awards for Best Foreign Language Film

== Bibliography ==
- Brill, Marlene Targ (2006). Illinois. New York, United States: Marshall Cavendish. ISBN 978-0-7614-1735-4.
- Osborne, Robert (2008). 80 Years of the Oscar: The Complete History of the Academy Awards. New York, United States: Abbeville Publishing Group. ISBN 978-0-7892-0992-4.
- Wiley, Mason; Bona, Damien (1996), Inside Oscar: The Unofficial History of the Academy Awards (5 ed.), New York, United States: Ballantine Books, ISBN 978-0-345-40053-6, OCLC 779680732
