= 40th British Academy Film Awards =

1987 film awards ceremony

- Date: 22 March 1987
- Site: Grosvenor House Hotel
- Hosted by: Ronnie Corbett; Ronnie Barker

Highlights
- Best Film: A Room with a View
- Best Actor: Bob Hoskins; Mona Lisa
- Best Actress: Maggie Smith; A Room with a View
- Most awards: A Room with a View (5)
- Most nominations: A Room with a View (14)

The 40th British Academy Film Awards, more commonly known as the BAFTAs, took place on 22 March 1987 at the Grosvenor House Hotel in London, honouring the best national and foreign films of 1986. Presented by the British Academy of Film and Television Arts, accolades were handed out for the best feature-length film and documentaries of any nationality that were screened at British cinemas in 1986.

James Ivory's A Room with a View won awards for Best Film, Actress, Supporting Actress, Production Design and Costume Design. Hannah and Her Sisters, directed by Woody Allen, won two awards: Best Director and Best Screenplay-Original.

The ceremony was hosted by The Two Ronnies stars, Ronnie Corbett and Ronnie Barker.

== Winners and nominees ==
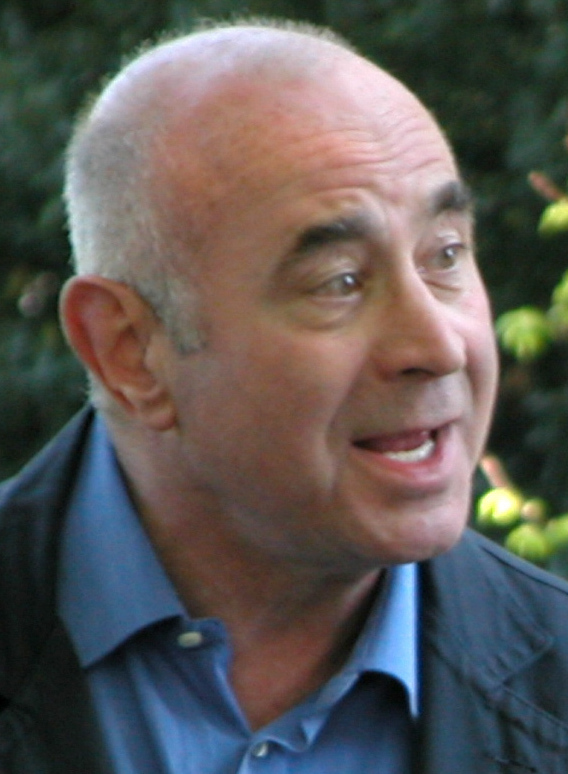
Bob Hoskins, Best Actor winner

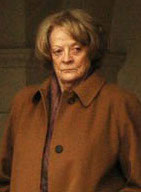
Maggie Smith, Best Actress winner

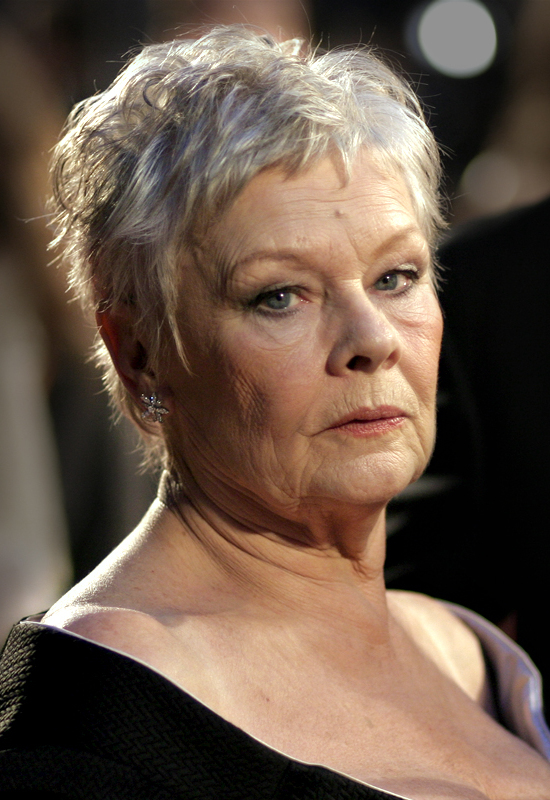
Judi Dench, Best Supporting Actress winner

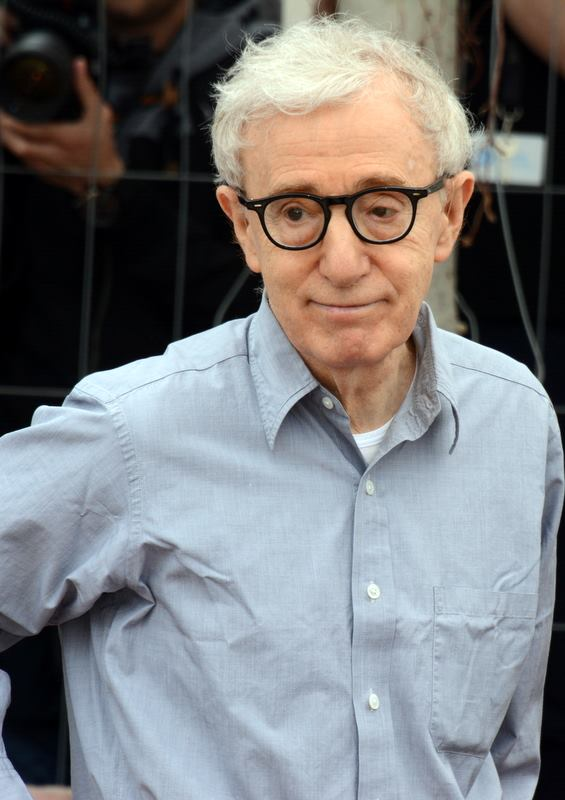
Woody Allen, Best Original Screenplay and Best Direction winner

- **Federico Fellini**

=== Outstanding British Contribution to Cinema ===
- **The Film Production Executives**

=== Awards ===
Winners are listed first and highlighted in boldface.

**Best Film**: **A Room with a View – Ismail Merchant and James Ivory**; Hannah and Her Sisters – Robert Greenhut and Woody Allen; The Mission – Fernando Ghia, David Puttnam and Roland Joffé; Mona Lisa – Stephen Woolley, Patrick Cassavetti and Neil Jordan	**Best Direction**: **Woody Allen – Hannah and Her Sisters**; James Ivory – A Room with a View; Neil Jordan – Mona Lisa; Roland Joffé – The Mission
**Best Actor in a Leading Role**: **Bob Hoskins – Mona Lisa as George**; Michael Caine – Hannah and Her Sisters as Elliot; Paul Hogan – Crocodile Dundee as Michael Dundee; Woody Allen – Hannah and Her Sisters as Mickey	**Best Actress in a Leading Role**: **Maggie Smith – A Room with a View as Charlotte Bartlett**; Cathy Tyson – Mona Lisa as Simone; Meryl Streep – Out of Africa as Karen Blixen; Mia Farrow – Hannah and Her Sisters as Hannah
**Best Actor in a Supporting Role**: **Ray McAnally – The Mission as Cardinal Altamirano**; Denholm Elliott – A Room with a View as Emerson; Klaus Maria Brandauer – Out of Africa as Bror and Hans; Simon Callow – A Room with a View as Beebe	**Best Actress in a Supporting Role**: **Judi Dench – A Room with a View as Eleanor Lavish**; Barbara Hershey – Hannah and Her Sisters as Lee; Rosanna Arquette – After Hours as Marcy Franklin; Rosemary Leach – A Room with a View as Mrs. Honeychurch
**Best Original Screenplay**: **Hannah and Her Sisters – Woody Allen**; Crocodile Dundee – Paul Hogan, Ken Shadie and John Cornell; The Mission – Robert Bolt; Mona Lisa – Neil Jordan and David Leland	**Best Adapted Screenplay**: **Out of Africa – Kurt Luedtke**; Children of a Lesser God – Hesper Anderson and Mark Medoff; The Color Purple – Menno Meyjes; Ran – Akira Kurosawa, Hideo Oguni and Masato Ide; A Room with a View – Ruth Prawer Jhabvala
**Best Cinematography**: **Out of Africa – David Watkin**; The Mission – Chris Menges; Ran – Takao Saito and Masaharu Ueda; A Room with a View – Tony Pierce-Roberts	**Best Costume Design**: **A Room with a View – Jenny Beavan and John Bright**; The Mission – Enrico Sabbatini; Out of Africa – Milena Canonero; Ran – Emi Wada
**Best Editing**: **The Mission – Jim Clark**; Hannah and Her Sisters – Susan E. Morse; Mona Lisa – Lesley Walker; A Room with a View – Humphrey Dixon	**Best Makeup and Hair**: **Ran – Shohichiro Meda, Tameyuki Aimi, Chihako Naito and Noriko Takamizawa**; Aliens – Peter Robb-King; Dreamchild – Jenny Shircore; Sid and Nancy – Peter Frampton
**Best Original Music**: **The Mission – Ennio Morricone**; Out of Africa – John Barry; A Room with a View – Richard Robbins; Round Midnight – Herbie Hancock	**Best Production Design**: **A Room with a View – Gianni Quaranta and Brian Ackland-Snow**; Aliens – Peter Lamont; The Mission – Stuart Craig; Ran – Yoshirō Muraki and Shinobu Muraki
**Best Sound**: **Out of Africa – Tom McCarthy Jr., Peter Handford and Chris Jenkins**; Aliens – Don Sharpe, Roy Charman and Graham V. Hartstone; The Mission – Ian Fuller, Bill Rowe and Clive Winter; A Room with a View – Tony Lenny, Ray Beckett and Richard King	**Best Special Visual Effects**: **Aliens – Robert Skotak, Brian Johnson, John Richardson, Stan Winston and Suzanne M. Benson**; Dreamchild – Duncan Kenworthy, John Stephenson and Chris Carr; Labyrinth – Roy Field, Brian Froud, George Gibbs and Tony Dunsterville; The Mission – Peter Hutchinson
**Best Documentary**: **Shoah – Claude Lanzmann**; British Cinema: Personal View A Turnip Head's Guide to the British Cinema – Alan Parker; Equinox: Prisoner of Consciousness – John Dollar; Forty Minutes: The Fishing Party – Paul Watson; Omnibus: The Mission – Robin Laugh; Viewpoint 86: Afghanistan: The Agony of a Nation – Sandy Gall	**Best Film Not in the English Language**: **Ran – Serge Silberman, Masato Hara and Akira Kurosawa**; Betty Blue – Jean-Jacques Beineix; Ginger and Fred – Alberto Grimaldi and Federico Fellini; Otello – Menahem Golan, Yoram Globus and Franco Zeffirelli
**Best Short Animation**: **SuperTed – David Edwards and Robin Lyons**; Danger Mouse – Brian Cosgrove and Mark Hall; Max Headroom's Giant Christmas Turkey – David Hiller; Paddington Goes to School – Martin Pullen; Thomas the Tank Engine and Friends – Robert D. Cardona and David Mitton; The Wind in the Willows – Brian Cosgrove and Mark Hall	**Best Short Film**: **La Boule – Simon Shore**; King's Christmas – Graham Dixon; Mohammed's Daughter – Suri Krishnamma; Night Movie – Gur Heller

== Statistics ==
Films that received multiple nominations
Nominations	Film
14	A Room with a View
11	The Mission
8	Hannah and Her Sisters
7	Out of Africa
6	Mona Lisa
6	Ran
4	Aliens
2	Crocodile Dundee
2	Dreamchild

Films that received multiple awards
Awards	Film
5	A Room with a View
3	The Mission
3	Out of Africa
2	Hannah and Her Sisters
2	Ran

== See also ==
- 59th Academy Awards
- 12th César Awards
- 39th Directors Guild of America Awards
- 44th Golden Globe Awards
- 7th Golden Raspberry Awards
- 1st Goya Awards
- 2nd Independent Spirit Awards
- 13th Saturn Awards
- 39th Writers Guild of America Awards
