= A Room with a View (1985 film) =

British romance film by James Ivory

- Theatrical release poster
- Directed by: James Ivory
- Screenplay by: Ruth Prawer Jhabvala
- Based on: A Room with a View; 1908 novel by E. M. Forster
- Produced by: Ismail Merchant
- Starring: Maggie Smith; Denholm Elliott; Judi Dench; Simon Callow; Helena Bonham Carter; Julian Sands; Daniel Day-Lewis; Fabia Drake; Patrick Godfrey; Rupert Graves; Joan Henley; Rosemary Leach
- Cinematography: Tony Pierce-Roberts
- Edited by: Humphrey Dixon
- Music by: Richard Robbins (score); Giacomo Puccini (themes, sung by Kiri Te Kanawa)
- Production companies: Merchant Ivory Productions; Goldcrest Films; FilmFour International
- Distributed by: Curzon Film Distributors (UK); Cinecom Pictures (US)
- Release dates: 13 December 1985 (Royal Command Performance); 11 April 1986 (UK Theatrical)
- Running time: 117 minutes
- Country: United Kingdom
- Language: English
- Budget: £2.3 million
- Box office: $60 million

A Room with a View is a 1985 British romance film directed by James Ivory and produced by Ismail Merchant. It was written by Ruth Prawer Jhabvala, who adapted E. M. Forster's 1908 novel A Room with a View. Set in England and Italy, it is about a young woman named Lucy Honeychurch (Helena Bonham Carter) in the final throes of the restrictive and repressed culture of Edwardian England and her developing love for a free-spirited young man, George Emerson (Julian Sands). Maggie Smith, Denholm Elliott, Daniel Day-Lewis, Judi Dench and Simon Callow feature in supporting roles. The film closely follows the novel by the use of chapter titles to distinguish thematic segments.

A Room with a View received universal critical acclaim and was a box-office success. At the 59th Academy Awards it was nominated for eight Academy Awards (including Best Picture) and won three: Best Adapted Screenplay, Best Art Direction and Best Costume Design. It also won five British Academy Film Awards and a Golden Globe. In 1999 the British Film Institute placed A Room with a View 73rd on its list of the top 100 British films.

== Plot ==
In 1907, a young Englishwoman, Lucy Honeychurch, and her much older cousin and chaperone, Charlotte Bartlett, stay at the Pensione Bertolini while on holiday in Florence. They are disappointed that their rooms do not have a view of the River Arno, as promised. At dinner, they meet other English guests: the Reverend Mr. Beebe; two elderly spinster sisters, the Misses Alan; romance author Eleanor Lavish; the freethinking Mr. Emerson; and his quiet, handsome son George.

Learning about Charlotte and Lucy's disappointment at not having a view of the river, Mr. Emerson and George offer to exchange rooms, though Charlotte considers the suggestion indelicate. Mr. Beebe mediates, and the switch is made. While touring the Piazza della Signoria the next day, Lucy witnesses a local man being brutally stabbed and killed. She faints, but George appears and comes to her aid. When Lucy has recovered, the two have a brief but unchaperoned discussion before returning to the pensione.

Later, Charlotte, Lucy and the Emersons join other British tourists for a day trip to the Fiesole countryside. The carriage driver canoodles with his girlfriend, sitting beside him, which upsets Reverend Eager, who insists the girlfriend get off the carriage in the middle of the countryside. Wishing to engage in gossip unsuitable for Lucy, Charlotte and Miss Lavish encourage her to go for a walk; Lucy goes looking for Mr. Beebe. The Italian driver, possibly misunderstanding Lucy's awkward Italian or possibly mischievously playing Cupid, instead leads her to where George Emerson is admiring the view from a hillside. Seeing Lucy across a poppy field, he suddenly embraces and passionately kisses her. Charlotte appears and intervenes. Worried that Lucy's mother will consider her an inadequate chaperone, Charlotte swears Lucy to secrecy and cuts their trip short.

Upon returning to Surrey in England, Lucy says nothing to her mother about the incident and pretends to forget it. She is soon engaged to Cecil Vyse, a wealthy and socially prominent man who is cold, snobbish, and pretentious. Cecil loves Lucy, but he and his mother consider the Honeychurch family their social inferiors, which offends Mrs. Honeychurch. Lucy soon learns that Mr. Emerson is moving into Sir Harry Otway's rental cottage, with George visiting at weekends. Lucy intended the two Misses Alan to live there and is cross to learn that, through a chance meeting with the Emersons in London, Cecil recommended the cottage to them. He proclaims his motive was to annoy Sir Harry, whom Cecil considers a snob; he assumes Harry will find the Emersons "too common".

George's presence upends Lucy's life, and her suppressed feelings for him surface. Cecil, her fiancé, asks for her permission to kiss her, then awkwardly does so. Lucy's non-sequitur comment that the people she met in Italy were "extraordinary" invites a comparison to the impromptu passionate kiss she received from George. Meanwhile, Lucy's brother, Freddy, becomes friends with George. Freddy invites George to play tennis at Windy Corner, the Honeychurch home, during which Cecil reads Miss Lavish's latest novel set in Italy. As Cecil mockingly reads aloud to Lucy and George, they recognise a scene as being identical to their encounter in the poppy field in Fiesole. Cecil, still reading, is oblivious when George passionately kisses Lucy in the garden. She confronts Charlotte, who admits to telling Miss Lavish about the kiss in the poppy field, which was then used in her story. Lucy orders George to leave Windy Corner and never return. He says that Cecil sees her only as a possession and will never love her for herself, as he would. Lucy seems unmoved, but soon after, she ends her engagement to Cecil, saying they are incompatible.

To escape the ensuing fallout, Lucy arranges to travel to Greece with the Misses Alan. George, unable to be around Lucy, arranges for his father to move to London, unaware that Lucy is no longer engaged. When Lucy calls at Mr. Beebe's home to fetch Charlotte, she is confronted by Mr. Emerson. She finally realises and admits her true feelings for George.

Sometime later, newlyweds George and Lucy honeymoon at the Italian pensione where they met, in the room with a view, overlooking Florence's Duomo.

== Cast ==
- Helena Bonham Carter as Lucy Honeychurch
- Julian Sands as George Emerson
- Maggie Smith as Charlotte Bartlett
- Denholm Elliott as Mr. Emerson
- Daniel Day-Lewis as Cecil Vyse
- Simon Callow as The Reverend Mr. Beebe
- Rosemary Leach as Mrs. Honeychurch, Lucy's mother
- Rupert Graves as Freddy Honeychurch, Lucy's brother
- Patrick Godfrey as The Reverend Mr. Eager
- Judi Dench as Eleanor Lavish, a novelist
- Fabia Drake as Miss Catharine Alan
- Joan Henley as Miss Teresa Alan
- Amanda Walker as Cockney Signora, pension owner
- Maria Britneva as Mrs. Vyse, Cecil's mother
- Mia Fothergill as Minnie Beebe
- Peter Cellier as Sir Harry Otway, a landlord

== Production ==
=== Background ===
E. M. Forster began to write A Room with a View during a trip to Italy in the winter of 1901–02 when he was twenty-two. It was the first novel he worked on; however, he put it away before returning to it a few years later. Forster finished first two other novels: Where Angels Fear to Tread (1905) and then The Longest Journey (1907). A Room with a View was finally published in 1908. Set in Italy and England, A Room with a View follows Lucy Honeychurch, a proper young Englishwoman who discovers passion while on a trip to Italy. At her return to the restrained culture of Edwardian-era England, she must choose between two opposite men: the free-thinking George Emerson and the repressed aesthete Cecil Vyse. The story is both a romance and a humorous critique of English society at the beginning of the 20th century. The novel, Forster's third, was very well received, better than his previous two, but it is considered lighter than his two best-regarded later works Howards End (1910) and A Passage to India (1924). In Forster's own appreciation "A Room with a View, may not be his best, but may very well be his nicest".

In 1946, 20th Century Fox offered $25,000 for the film rights to A Room with a View, but Forster did not hold cinema in high regard and refused although the studio was willing to pay him even more.

Following Forster's death in 1970, the board of fellows of King's College, Cambridge, inherited the rights to his books. However, Donald A Parry, chief executor, turned down all approaches. Ten years later, the film rights for Forster's novels became available when the film enthusiast Professor Bernard Williams became chief executor. The trustees of Forster's estate invited producer Ismail Merchant and director James Ivory to Cambridge to discuss filming Forster. Ivory later said he was more enthusiastic about the novel than Merchant and Jhabvala. Jhabvala wrote the first draft. Ivory rewrote it, then Jhabvala did another draft.

The film was made on a budget of $3 million that included investment by Cinecom in the U.S., and from Goldcrest Films, the National Film Finance Corporation, and Curzon Film Distributors in Great Britain. Merchant and Ivory had originally been rejected twice by Jake Eberts of Goldcrest Films but obtained money from the company after Eberts left. Eberts would later admit to being "completely wrong" about the film.

=== Casting ===
The role of Lucy Honeychurch was Helena Bonham Carter's breakthrough as a film actress. She was eighteen at the time and had just finished the art-house film Lady Jane (1986). Ivory gave her the role as he found "she was very quick, very smart, and very beautiful". She fit Forster's description of Lucy as "a young lady with a quantity of dark hair and a very pretty, pale, undeveloped face".

Rupert Everett auditioned for the role of Cecil Vyse. He would rather have played George Emerson, but Ivory thought that he was not quite right for it. It was Julian Sands who was cast as the male lead. Sands had gained notice as the British photographer in The Killing Fields (1984).

Daniel Day-Lewis came to the attention of Ivory through his role in the play Another Country as the gay student Guy Bennet. Given the choice of either George Emerson or Cecil Vyse, he took on the more challenging role of Cecil. The role of Freddy Honeychurch, Lucy's brother, went to Rupert Graves, in his film debut. He had had a minor role as one of the schoolboys in the play Another Country.

Simon Callow had been Ivory's original choice for the character of Harry Hamilton-Paul, the friend of the Nawab, in the Merchant Ivory film Heat and Dust, but had committed to a play in London's West End. He had created the role of Mozart in the original London stage production of Peter Shaffer's play Amadeus (1979) and made his film debut in a small role in the film adaptation. In A Room with a View, he was cast as the vicar Mr. Beebe.

The supporting cast included veteran performers: Five years earlier, Maggie Smith had worked in another Merchant Ivory film, Quartet. With a prominent theatre career, Judi Dench had made her film debut in 1964, but she took the supporting role of Eleanor Lavish. Dench and Ivory had disagreements during the filming of A Room with a View because, among other things, he suggested that she play her character as a Scot.

=== Filming ===
A Room with a View was shot extensively on location in Florence, where Merchant Ivory had the Piazza della Signoria cleared for filming. Pensione Quisisana served as the Pensione Bertolini, also Villa di Maiano in some interiors. From its decoration of the walls they asked a painter to do a series of grotesque artworks, to be used as titles between sections of the film following the chapter titles of Forster's novel.

Other scenes were filmed in London and around the town of Sevenoaks in Kent, where they borrowed film critic John Pym's family estate for their country scenes. Lucy's engagement party was filmed in the grounds of Emmetts Garden. Foxwold House near Chiddingstone was used for the Honeychurch house and an artificial pond was built in the forest of the property to use as the "Sacred Lake". Two years later, the Great Storm of 1987 would tear through the area and destroy the gardens and almost 80 acres of the surrounding forest. In London, the Linley Sambourne House in South Kensington was used for Cecil's house and the Estonian Legation on Queensway was used for the boarding house where the Miss Alans live. In all, A Room with a View was shot in ten weeks: four in Italy and six in England.

The film includes a notable scene of full frontal male nudity in which George, Freddy, and Mr. Beebe swim nude in the Sacred Lake.

== Reception ==
=== Critical reception ===
The film received positive reviews from critics, holding a 100% rating on Rotten Tomatoes based on 35 reviews, with a weighted average of 8.5/10. The site's consensus reads: "The hard edges of E. M Forster's novel may be sanded off, but what we get with A Room with a View is an eminently entertaining comedy with an intellectual approach to love". According to Metacritic, which sampled the opinions of 21 critics and calculated a score of 83 out of 100, the film received "universal acclaim". Roger Ebert gave the film four out of four stars, writing: "It is an intellectual film, but intellectual about emotions: It encourages us to think about how we feel, instead of simply acting on our feelings." In a survey of 100 US newspaper critics' ten-best lists for 1986, A Room With a View appeared on 61, more than any film but Hannah and Her Sisters.

=== Box office ===
When Jake Eberts returned to Goldcrest he saw the film and "thought it had no chance commercially.". However the film turned into a hit in Britain and the US. The film made $4.4 million at the US box office in the first 12 weeks of release. After six months on release, it returned a distributor's gross of £2,026,304 in Britain. It made US $14 million from North America. According to one account the film made $60 million internationally.

Goldcrest Films invested £460,000 in the film and earned £1,901,000 meaning they made a profit of £1,441,000. Eberts did say the money earned "was just not a big enough sum to make an impact on our cash flow. The film's main benefit to us was that it added lustre to our name, helped to maintain our high profile in the foreign market and, not least, earn us some welcome sales commissions." The film's box office success was not enough to help Goldcrest survive the losses from Absolute Beginners, The Mission and Revolution.

== Accolades ==
Award	Category	Nominee(s)	Result	Ref.
Academy Awards	Best Picture (Note: The film was the first unrated film in the United States to receive a Best Picture nom.)	Ismail Merchant	Nominated	
Academy Awards	Best Director	James Ivory	Nominated	
Academy Awards	Best Supporting Actress	Maggie Smith	Nominated	
Academy Awards	Best Supporting Actor	Denholm Elliott	Nominated	
Academy Awards	Best Adapted Screenplay	Ruth Prawer Jhabvala	Won	
Academy Awards	Best Art Direction	Art Direction: Gianni Quaranta and Brian Ackland-Snow; Set Decoration: Brian Savegar and Elio Altamura	Won	
Academy Awards	Best Cinematography	Tony Pierce-Roberts	Nominated	
Academy Awards	Best Costume Design	Jenny Beavan and John Bright	Won	
American Society of Cinematographers Awards	Outstanding Achievement in Cinematography in Theatrical Releases	Tony Pierce-Roberts	Nominated	
British Academy Film Awards	Best Film	Ismail Merchant and James Ivory	Won	
British Academy Film Awards	Best Direction	James Ivory	Nominated	
British Academy Film Awards	Best Actress in a Leading Role	Maggie Smith	Won	
British Academy Film Awards	Best Actor in a Supporting Role	Simon Callow	Nominated	
British Academy Film Awards	Best Actor in a Supporting Role	Denholm Elliott	Nominated	
British Academy Film Awards	Best Actress in a Supporting Role	Judi Dench	Won	
British Academy Film Awards	Best Actress in a Supporting Role	Rosemary Leach	Nominated	
British Academy Film Awards	Best Adapted Screenplay	Ruth Prawer Jhabvala	Nominated	
British Academy Film Awards	Best Cinematography	Tony Pierce-Roberts	Nominated	
British Academy Film Awards	Best Costume Design	Jenny Beavan and John Bright	Won	
British Academy Film Awards	Best Editing	Humphrey Dixon	Nominated	
British Academy Film Awards	Best Original Score	Richard Robbins	Nominated	
British Academy Film Awards	Best Production Design	Gianni Quaranta and Brian Ackland-Snow	Won	
British Academy Film Awards	Best Sound	Tony Lenny, Ray Beckett, and Richard King	Nominated	
British Society of Cinematographers Awards	Best Cinematography in a Theatrical Feature Film	Tony Pierce-Roberts	Nominated	
David di Donatello Awards	Best Foreign Film	James Ivory	Won	
David di Donatello Awards	Best Foreign Director	James Ivory	Won	
Directors Guild of America Awards	Outstanding Directorial Achievement in Motion Pictures	James Ivory	Nominated	
Evening Standard British Film Awards	Best Film	James Ivory	Won	
Evening Standard British Film Awards	Best Technical or Artistic Achievement	Tony Pierce-Roberts	Won	
Golden Globe Awards	Best Motion Picture – Drama		Nominated	
Golden Globe Awards	Best Supporting Actress – Motion Picture	Maggie Smith	Won	
Golden Globe Awards	Best Director – Motion Picture	James Ivory	Nominated	
Independent Spirit Awards	Best Foreign Film (Special Distinction Award)		Won	
Kansas City Film Critics Circle Awards	Best Supporting Actor	Denholm Elliott	Won	
Kansas City Film Critics Circle Awards	Best Supporting Actress	Maggie Smith	Won	
London Film Critics' Circle Awards	Film of the Year		Won	
National Board of Review Awards	Best Film		Won	
National Board of Review Awards	Top Ten Films		Won	
National Board of Review Awards	Best Supporting Actor	Daniel Day-Lewis (also for My Beautiful Laundrette)	Won	
National Society of Film Critics Awards	Best Supporting Actor	Daniel Day-Lewis (also for My Beautiful Laundrette)	2nd Place	
New York Film Critics Circle Awards	Best Supporting Actor	Daniel Day-Lewis (also for My Beautiful Laundrette)	Won	
New York Film Critics Circle Awards	Best Screenplay	Ruth Prawer Jhabvala	3rd Place	
New York Film Critics Circle Awards	Best Cinematographer	Tony Pierce-Roberts	Won	
Sant Jordi Awards	Best Foreign Film	James Ivory	Won	
Venice International Film Festival	Golden Lion	James Ivory	Nominated	
Writers Guild of America Awards	Best Screenplay – Based on Material from Another Medium	Ruth Prawer Jhabvala	Won	

== Soundtrack ==
1. "O mio babbino caro" (from Gianni Schicchi by Puccini) – Kiri Te Kanawa with the LPO, conducted by Sir John Pritchard
2. "The Pensione Bertollini"
3. "Lucy, Charlotte, and Miss Lavish See the City"
4. "In the Piazza Signoria"
5. "The Embankment"
6. "Phaeton and Persephone"
7. "Chi il bel sogno di Doretta" (from La Rondine, Act One by Puccini) – Te Kanawa with the LPO, conducted by Pritchard
8. "The Storm"
9. "Home, and the Betrothal"
10. "The Sacred Lake"
11. "The Allan Sisters"
12. "In the National Gallery"
13. "Windy Corner"
14. "Habanera" (from Carmen by Georges Bizet)
15. "The Broken Engagement"
16. "Return to Florence"
17. "End Titles"
- Original music composed by Richard Robbins
- Soundtrack album produced by Simon Heyworth
- Arrangements by Frances Shaw and Barrie Guard
- Music published by Filmtrax PLC

The film also includes music played by Lucy on the piano:

- in the pensione, Piano Sonata No. 21 Op.53 'Waldstein' II. Introduzione. Adagio molto, by Ludwig van Beethoven
- for Cecil's family, Piano Sonata No. 4 Op. 164 D 537, by Franz Schubert

And Piano Sonata No. 8 K. 310 I. Allegro maestoso, by Wolfgang Amadeus Mozart

== See also ==
- Baedeker, a travel guide mentioned several times in the film
- Chiddingstone Castle, used as a filming location
- BFI Top 100 British films

== Sources ==
- Eberts, Jake; Illott, Terry (1990). My indecision is final. Faber and Faber.
- Ingersoll, Earl G. Filming Forster: The Challenges of Adapting E.M. Forster's Novels for the Screen. Fairleigh Dickinson University Press. 2012, ISBN 978-1-61147-682-8
- Long, Robert Emmet. The Films of Merchant Ivory. Citadel Press. 1993, ISBN 0-8065-1470-1
- Long, Robert Emmet. James Ivory in Conversation. University of California Press, 2005, ISBN 0-520-23415-4.
