= 1986 Academy Awards =

1986 Academy Awards may refer to:

- 58th Academy Awards, the Academy Awards ceremony that took place in 1986
- 59th Academy Awards, the 1987 ceremony honoring the best in film for 1986
