= Brian Savegar =

Production designer

Brian Kendal Savegar
- Born: 24 August 1932; Abergavenny, Wales
- Died: 31 March 2007 (aged 74)
- Occupation: Production designer
- Years active: 1980-2001

Brian Savegar (24 August 1932 – 31 March 2007) was a production designer in the film and TV industry. He won an Academy Award in 1986 in the category Best Art Direction for the film A Room with a View.

== Early years ==
Born and raised in Abergavenny with his younger sister Pat, he was encouraged to be musical by his parents, Gwen and Archie, who both loved jazz. Despite Archie being an amateur drummer, Brian took up the trumpet and learned to play at an early age. While studying Fine Art at the Cardiff College of Art, he was good enough to play trumpet semi-professionally, performing with local jazz bands in and around Cardiff and Bristol, including a brief membership of the fledgling Acker Bilk Bristol Paramount Jazz Band.

His skills as a graphic artist were developed when he worked as an Art Editor and Designer before joining the film industry in 1962, when it became apparent that he had to decide whether to earn a living in an artistic occupation or as a musician playing jazz. He moved to Cookham, near Maidenhead, in the early '60s while working in various UK film production and design roles at Shepperton and Pinewood Studios. During this time he was a member of Thames Valley Rugby Club playing for the first XV. He also developed a keen interest in vintage cars and at one time owned an Invicta among other vehicles.

In the early seventies he decamped to Ferney Voltaire on the French-Swiss border, after his wife Sarah had been offered a job with a UN agency in Geneva. After some anticipated corporate film projects failed to materialize, he spent most of his time renovating an old property in the Pays de Gex commune and propping up various bars in Ferney.

== Film success ==
After his marriage failed in the late 1970s, he reactivated his network of film contacts and this led to a job offer on a film that was being made in London. From there he moved back into the mainstream film and TV industry where he enjoyed considerable success over the next 20 years. He split his time principally between the UK and New Orleans where he worked on both TV and film projects. The pinnacle of his success was achieved in 1986 when he jointly won the Oscar with Elio Altramura for Set Design & Art Direction on the Merchant Ivory production of A Room with a View. The Oscar was presented to him by Isabella Rossellini and Christopher Reeve at the 59th Academy Awards ceremony on 30 March 1987 and he publicly thanked James Ivory from the podium. The competing nominations in that year were Aliens, The Mission, The Color of Money and Hannah and her Sisters. He also won an Emmy Award for Outstanding Art Direction for a Series on Dinosaurs for the episode "The Mating Dance". He was also a member of the Art Directors Branch of the Academy of Motion Picture Arts and Sciences.

== Final years ==
Following his new-found success in films and TV, he bought himself a home in the southern French village of Roumoules in Provence. He was diagnosed with diabetes in 1989 and this led him to gradually reduce his workload during the late 1990s and to spend more time at his home in France. He took up his trumpet playing again and would perform with local and visiting jazz musicians. He succumbed to the condition on 31 March 2007, aged 74.

== Selected filmography ==
- 1999 The Fall Production Designer
- 1999 Michael Landon, the Father I Knew Production Designer
- 1996 Dalva Production Designer
- 1993 Trapped Alive Production Designer
- 1992 Hoffa Set Decorator
- 1990 The Inheritor Director
- 1987 Maurice Art Director
- 1985 A Room with a View Production Designer
- 1984 Space Riders Art Director
- 1983 Screamtime Art Director
- 1982 The Last Horror Film Art Director
- 1982 The Fanatic Art Director
- 1980 Babylon Art Director

== TV credits ==
- 1984 Remington Steele Art Director
- 1986 Hold the Dream Set Decorator
- 1991 Dinosaurs Set Decorator (5 episodes)
- 1995 Dazzle Production Designer
- 1996 The Big Easy Production Designer (13 episodes)
- 1996 Lucifer's Child Production Designer
- 1997 Rag and Bone Production Designer
- 2001 Conspiracy Set Dresser
