= 1986 New York Film Critics Circle Awards =

52nd New York Film Critics Circle Awards

52nd New York Film Critics Circle Awards

January 25, 1987

Best Picture:
Hannah and Her Sisters

The 52nd New York Film Critics Circle Awards honored the best filmmaking of 1986. The winners were announced on 15 December 1986 and the awards were given on 25 January 1987.

== Winners ==
Best Actor

- Bob Hoskins: Mona Lisa

2. Paul Newman: The Color of Money
3. Jeff Goldblum: The Fly

Best Actress

- Sissy Spacek: Crimes of the Heart

2. Kathleen Turner: Peggy Sue Got Married
3. Chloe Webb: Sid and Nancy

Best Cinematography

- Tony Pierce-Roberts: A Room with a View

2. Frederick Elmes: Blue Velvet
3. Chris Menges: The Mission

Best Director

- Woody Allen: Hannah and Her Sisters

2. Oliver Stone: Platoon and Salvador
3. David Lynch: Blue Velvet

Best Documentary

- Marlene

2. Sherman's March
3. Partisans of Vilna

Best Film

- Hannah and Her Sisters

2. Platoon
3. Blue Velvet

Best Foreign Language Film

- The Decline of the American Empire

2. Men...
3. 'Round Midnight
4. Vagabond

Best Screenplay

- Hanif Kureishi: My Beautiful Laundrette

2. Woody Allen: Hannah and Her Sisters
3. Ruth Prawer Jhabvala: A Room with a View

Best Supporting Actor

- Daniel Day-Lewis: My Beautiful Laundrette & A Room with a View

2. Andy Garcia: 8 Million Ways to Die
3. Ray Liotta: Something Wild

Best Supporting Actress

- Dianne Wiest: Hannah and Her Sisters

2. Cathy Tyson: Mona Lisa
3. Mary Elizabeth Mastrantonio: The Color of Money
