= Jenny Beavan =

British costume designer (born 1950)

Jenny Beavan OBE
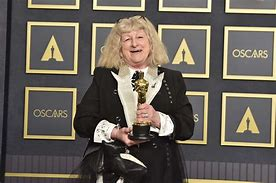
- Born: 15 November 1950 (age 75); London, England
- Occupation: Costume designer
- Years active: 1978 — present
- Spouse: Ian Albery (before 1985)
- Children: 1

Jenny Beavan OBE, RDI (born 1950) is a British costume designer. She has received numerous accolades, including three Academy Awards, four BAFTA Film Awards, two Emmy Awards, and an Olivier Award, in addition to nominations for three BAFTA Television Awards and a Tony Award. She was honored with the Costume Designers Guild Career Achievement Award in 2025. Beavan was appointed Officer of the Order of the British Empire (OBE) in 2017.

Beavan came to prominence for her decade-long collaboration with John Bright on creating the costumes for Merchant Ivory Productions. She has received 12 nominations for the Academy Award for Best Costume Design and has won three times for A Room with a View (1985), Mad Max: Fury Road (2015), and Cruella (2021). She has also been nominated for the BAFTA Award for Best Costume Design ten times and had a record four wins for A Room With a View, Gosford Park (2001), Mad Max: Fury Road, and Cruella.

On television, Beavan has been nominated for the Primetime Emmy Award for Outstanding Costumes for a Miniseries, Movie, or Special five times, winning twice for Emma (1996) and Return to Cranford (2010). She has also received three nominations for the British Academy Television Craft Award for Best Costume Design.

On stage, Beavan created costumes for various Royal Shakespeare Company, West End, and Broadway productions. She won the Laurence Olivier Award for Best Costume Design for the 2001 West End revival of the Noël Coward comedy play Private Lives, and she received the Tony Award for Best Costume Design nomination the following year when the production was transferred to Broadway.

== Early life ==
Beavan was born in London, England. Her father was a cellist, and her mother a viola player. She has a sister. Beavan credits her parents for instilling a strong work ethic. At the age of ten, Beavan's grandfather took her to a showing of the play Twelfth Night and from that moment on she knew she had to be involved in theater in some type of way. She attended Putney High School, an independent girls' day school in Putney, London. For college, she attended the Central School of Art and Design (currently Central St. Martin's), and under the teachings of Ralph Koltai she studied stage design. Despite being taught that costuming was "insignificant," she began to love the craft.

== Career ==
Jenny Beavan is known for her work on Merchant Ivory films. In the 1970s, she worked on set design for London theatrical productions. She joined the field of film costume design after obtaining an unpaid position to design garments for a small Merchant Ivory film, Hullabaloo Over Georgie and Bonnie's Pictures. Beavan was assistant to Judy Moorcroft on the 1979 film The Europeans, the first 'proper' Merchant-Ivory film that featured precise and authentic period costuming. This began her long relationship with Merchant Ivory productions.

She has frequently worked with costume designer John Bright, who runs the costume-rental house Cosprop, and credits him with educating her as she was starting out her career. She said she was helped by "just listening to him and learning from him, learning the history and the politics of clothing". Since then, the two have collaborated on more than ten films together and have shared six Oscar nominations.

The process of designing is standard, but every designer has their own process. Beavans design process begins with breaking down scripts and reviewing until they are known like the back of her hand, developing an understanding of each character. A costume is the second skin of an actor. For Beavan it all starts from the script and the character as she says she's "creating the person who's wearing the clothes."

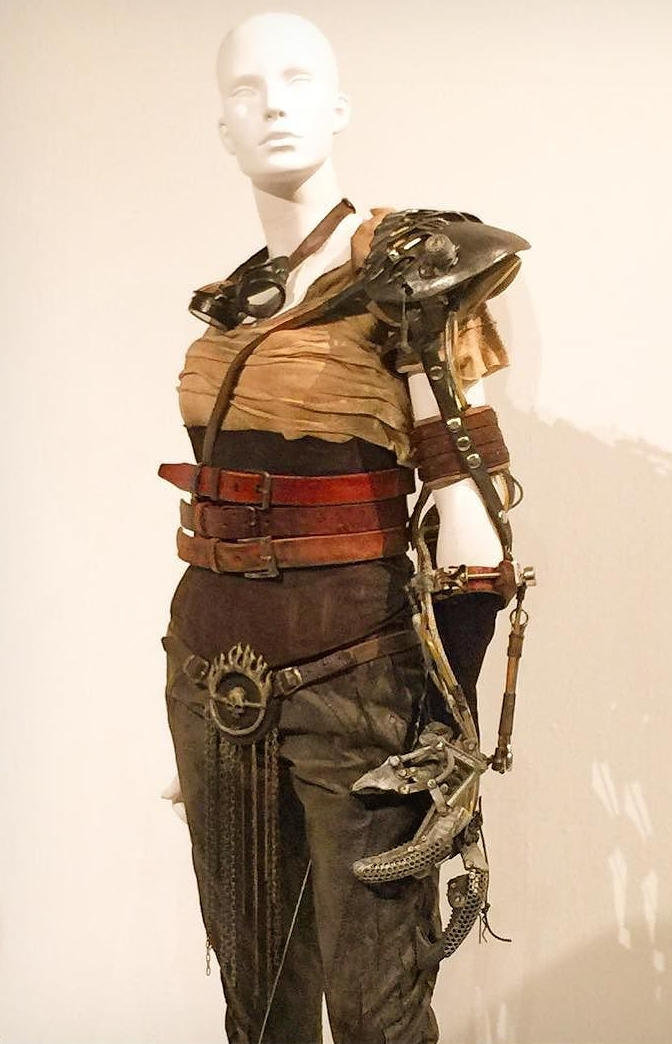
Detail of the costume worn by Charlize Theron as Imperator Furiosa in Mad Max: Fury Road, designed by Beavan.

In 2016, Beavan won her 3rd BAFTA and 2nd Academy Award in George Miller's post-apocalyptic action film Mad Max: Fury Road.

Beavan was appointed Officer of the Order of the British Empire (OBE) in the 2017 New Year Honours for services to drama production.

In June 2018, Beavan was awarded an Honorary Fellowship by Arts University Bournemouth alongside dancer Darcey Bussell, graphic designer Margaret Calvert, OBE, and director and screenwriter Edgar Wright.

In 2022, Beavan nabbed her 4th BAFTA, as well as her 3rd Academy Award for Craig Gillespie's Disney live-action spin-off of Cruella.

== Personal life ==
She has one daughter, Caitlin, a theatre producer born in 1985. They worked together on the West End theatre production of Third Finger Left Hand at Trafalgar Studios in 2013.

== Filmography ==
=== Film ===
Year	Title	Director	Notes
1979	The Europeans	James Ivory	Costume assistant to Judy Moorcroft
1980	Jane Austen in Manhattan	James Ivory	
1984	The Bostonians	James Ivory	with John Bright
1985	A Room with a View	James Ivory	with John Bright
1987	Maurice	James Ivory	with John Bright
1988	A Summer Story	Piers Haggard	
1988	The Deceivers	Nicholas Meyer	with John Bright
1990	Mountains of the Moon	Bob Rafelson	with John Bright
1991	White Fang	Randal Kleiser	with John Bright
1991	Impromptu	James Lapine	
1992	Howards End	James Ivory	with John Bright
1993	Swing Kids	Thomas Carter	
1993	The Remains of the Day	James Ivory	with John Bright
1994	Black Beauty	Caroline Thompson	
1995	Jefferson in Paris	James Ivory	with John Bright
1995	Sense and Sensibility	Ang Lee	with John Bright
1996	Jane Eyre	Franco Zeffirelli	
1997	Metroland	Philip Saville	
1998	Ever After	Andy Tennant	
1999	Tea with Mussolini	Franco Zeffirelli	with Anna Anni and Alberto Spiazzi
1999	Anna and the King	Andy Tennant	
2001	Gosford Park	Robert Altman	
2002	Possession	Neil LaBute	
2003	Timeline	Richard Donner	
2004	Alexander	Oliver Stone	
2005	Casanova	Lasse Hallström	
2006	The Amazing Grace	Jeta Amata	
2006	The Black Dahlia	Brian De Palma	
2006	Amazing Grace	Michael Apted	
2008	Defiance	Edward Zwick	
2009	Sherlock Holmes	Guy Ritchie	
2010	The King's Speech	Tom Hooper	
2011	Sherlock Holmes: A Game of Shadows	Guy Ritchie	
2012	Gambit	Michael Hoffman	
2015	Child 44	Daniel Espinosa	
2015	Mad Max: Fury Road	George Miller	
2016	A United Kingdom	Amma Asante	
2016	A Cure for Wellness	Gore Verbinski	
2017	Life	Daniel Espinosa	
2018	Christopher Robin	Marc Forster	
2018	The Nutcracker and the Four Realms	Lasse Hallström; Joe Johnston	
2019	Mrs Lowry & Son	Adrian Noble	
2020	Dolittle	Stephen Gaghan	
2021	Cruella	Craig Gillespie	
2022	Mrs. Harris Goes to Paris	Anthony Fabian	
2024	White Bird	Marc Forster	
2024	Furiosa: A Mad Max Saga	George Miller	
2025	The Choral	Nicholas Hytner	
2028	Elden Ring	Alex Garland	Post-production

=== Television ===
Year	Title	Notes
1978	Hullabaloo Over Georgie and Bonnie's Pictures	with Purnima Agarwal; Also makes a cameo as Governess; Television film
1980	Holding the Fort	Episode: "Over a Barrel"
1981	A Fine Romance	6 episodes
1986	Lord Mountbatten: The Last Viceroy	6 episodes
1989	Back Home	Television film
1992	The Blackheath Poisonings	3 episodes
1996	Emma	Television film
2002	The Gathering Storm	Television film
2003	Byron	2 episodes
2007	Cranford	5 episodes
2009	Return to Cranford	2 episodes
2015	Esio Trot	Television film

== Awards and nominations ==
Major associations

Academy Awards

Year	Category	Nominated work	Result	Ref.
1985	Best Costume Design	The Bostonians	Nominated	
1987	Best Costume Design	A Room with a View	Won	
1988	Best Costume Design	Maurice	Nominated	
1993	Best Costume Design	Howards End	Nominated	
1994	Best Costume Design	The Remains of the Day	Nominated	
1996	Best Costume Design	Sense and Sensibility	Nominated	
2000	Best Costume Design	Anna and the King	Nominated	
2002	Best Costume Design	Gosford Park	Nominated	
2011	Best Costume Design	The King's Speech	Nominated	
2016	Best Costume Design	Mad Max: Fury Road	Won	
2022	Best Costume Design	Cruella	Won	
2023	Best Costume Design	Mrs. Harris Goes to Paris	Nominated	

BAFTA Awards

Year	Category	Nominated work	Result	Ref.
British Academy Film Awards
1985	Best Costume Design	The Bostonians	Nominated	
1987	Best Costume Design	A Room with a View	Won	
1993	Best Costume Design	Howards End	Nominated	
1996	Best Costume Design	Sense and Sensibility	Nominated	
2000	Best Costume Design	Tea with Mussolini	Nominated	
2002	Best Costume Design	Gosford Park	Won	
2011	Best Costume Design	The King's Speech	Nominated	
2016	Best Costume Design	Mad Max: Fury Road	Won	
2022	Best Costume Design	Cruella	Won	
2023	Best Costume Design	Mrs. Harris Goes to Paris	Nominated	
British Academy Television Craft Awards
2003	Best Costume Design	The Gathering Storm	Nominated	
2008	Best Costume Design	Cranford	Nominated	
2010	Best Costume Design	Return to Cranford	Nominated	

Emmy Awards

Year	Category	Nominated work	Result	Ref.
Primetime Emmy Awards
1986	Outstanding Costumes for a Miniseries, Movie, or Special	Lord Mountbatten: The Last Viceroy (Episode: "Part 1")	Nominated	
1997	Outstanding Costumes for a Miniseries, Movie, or Special	Emma	Won (Note: Tied with Mary Malin for The Inheritance)	
2002	Outstanding Costumes for a Miniseries, Movie, or Special	The Gathering Storm	Nominated	
2008	Outstanding Costumes for a Miniseries, Movie, or Special	Cranford (Episode: "Part 1")	Nominated	
2010	Outstanding Costumes for a Miniseries, Movie, or Special	Return to Cranford (Episode: "Part 2")	Won	

Laurence Olivier Awards

Year	Category	Nominated work	Result	Ref.
2002	Best Costume Design	Private Lives	Won	

Tony Awards

Year	Category	Nominated work	Result	Ref.
2002	Best Costume Design	Private Lives	Nominated	

Miscellaneous awards

List of Jenny Beavan other awards and nominations
Award	Year (Note: Indicates the year of ceremony. Each year is linked to the article about the awards held that year, wherever possible.)	Category	Title	Result	Ref.
AACTA Awards	2015	Best Costume Design	Mad Max: Fury Road	Nominated	
AACTA Awards	2025	Best Costume Design	Furiosa: A Mad Max Saga	Won	
Africa Movie Academy Awards	2007	Best Costume Design	The Amazing Grace	Nominated	
American Cinematheque's Tribute to the Crafts	2022	Costume Designer – Feature Film	Cruella	Won	
Astra Film and Creative Arts Awards	2022	Best Costume Design	Cruella	Won	
Astra Film and Creative Arts Awards	2023	Best Costume Design	Mrs. Harris Goes to Paris	Nominated	
Astra Film and Creative Arts Awards	2024	Best Costume Design	Furiosa: A Mad Max Saga	Nominated	
British Independent Film Awards	2022	Best Costume Design	Mrs. Harris Goes to Paris	Won	
Camerimage	2023	Costume Designer with Unique Visual Sensitivity	—N/a	Honored	
Chicago Film Critics Association Awards	2021	Best Costume Design	Cruella	Nominated	
Chicago Film Critics Association Awards	2024	Best Costume Design	Furiosa: A Mad Max Saga	Won	
Ciak d'oro	1999	Best Costume Design	Tea with Mussolini	Nominated	
Costume Designers Guild Awards	2009	Outstanding Made for Television Movie or Miniseries	Cranford	Nominated	
Costume Designers Guild Awards	2010	Excellence in Period Film	Sherlock Holmes	Nominated	
Costume Designers Guild Awards	2011	Excellence in Period Film	The King's Speech	Won	
Costume Designers Guild Awards	2016	Excellence in Fantasy Film	Mad Max: Fury Road	Won	
Costume Designers Guild Awards	2019	Excellence in Sci-Fi/Fantasy Film	The Nutcracker and the Four Realms	Nominated	
Costume Designers Guild Awards	2021	Excellence in Sci-Fi/Fantasy Film	Dolittle	Nominated	
Costume Designers Guild Awards	2022	Excellence in Period Film	Cruella	Won	
Costume Designers Guild Awards	2023	Excellence in Period Film	Mrs. Harris Goes to Paris	Nominated	
Costume Designers Guild Awards	2025	Excellence in Sci-Fi/Fantasy Film	Furiosa: A Mad Max Saga	Nominated	
Costume Designers Guild Awards	2025	Career Achievement Award	—N/a	Honored	
Critics' Choice Awards	2011	Best Costume Design	The King's Speech	Nominated	
Critics' Choice Awards	2016	Best Costume Design	Mad Max: Fury Road	Won	
Critics' Choice Awards	2022	Best Costume Design	Cruella	Won	
David di Donatello Awards	1996	Best Costumes	Jane Eyre	Won	
Drama Desk Awards	2002	Outstanding Costume Design	Private Lives	Nominated	
Empire Awards	2016	Best Costume Design	Mad Max: Fury Road	Won	
Evening Standard British Film Awards	2011	Technical Achievement Award	The King's Speech	Nominated	
Las Vegas Film Critics Society Awards	2010	Best Costume Design	The King's Speech	Nominated	
Las Vegas Film Critics Society Awards	2015	Best Costume Design	Mad Max: Fury Road	Won	
Las Vegas Film Critics Society Awards	2021	Best Costume Design	Cruella	Won	
Las Vegas Film Critics Society Awards	2024	Best Costume Design	Furiosa: A Mad Max Saga	Nominated	
London Film Critics' Circle Awards	2022	Technical Achievement Award	Cruella	Nominated	
Online Film Critics Society Awards	2022	Best Costume Design	Cruella	Nominated	
Online Film Critics Society Awards	2025	Best Costume Design	Furiosa: A Mad Max Saga	Nominated	
Phoenix Film Critics Society Awards	2002	Best Costume Design	Gosford Park	Nominated	
Phoenix Film Critics Society Awards	2010	Best Costume Design	The King's Speech	Nominated	
Phoenix Film Critics Society Awards	2015	Best Costume Design	Mad Max: Fury Road	Won	
Royal Television Society Craft & Design Awards	2004	Best Costume Design – Drama	Byron	Won	
San Diego Film Critics Society Awards	2022	Best Costume Design	Cruella	Won	
San Diego Film Critics Society Awards	2023	Best Costume Design	Mrs. Harris Goes to Paris	Runner-up	
Satellite Awards	1999	Best Costume Design	Ever After	Nominated	
Satellite Awards	2000	Best Costume Design	Anna and the King	Nominated	
Satellite Awards	2006	Best Costume Design	The Black Dahlia	Nominated	
Satellite Awards	2007	Best Costume Design	Amazing Grace	Nominated	
Satellite Awards	2010	Best Costume Design	The King's Speech	Nominated	
Saturn Awards	1999	Best Costume Design	Ever After	Won	
Saturn Awards	2010	Best Costume Design	Sherlock Holmes	Nominated	
Saturn Awards	2012	Best Costume Design	Sherlock Holmes: A Game of Shadows	Nominated	
Saturn Awards	2022	Best Costume Design	Cruella	Nominated	
Seattle Film Critics Society Awards (Note: prior to the SFCS formal establishment in 2016, a group of Seattle-area critics compiled the Seattle Film Critics Awards in 2014 and 2015.)	2016	Best Costume Design	Mad Max: Fury Road	Won	
Seattle Film Critics Society Awards	2022	Best Costume Design	Cruella	Nominated	
Seattle Film Critics Society Awards	2024	Best Costume Design	Furiosa: A Mad Max Saga	Nominated	
St. Louis Film Critics Association Awards	2021	Best Costume Design	Cruella	Won	
St. Louis Film Critics Association Awards	2022	Best Costume Design	Mrs. Harris Goes to Paris	Nominated	

Honorary degrees

Name of school, year given, and name of degree
School	Year	Degree	Ref.
Arts University Bournemouth	2018	Honorary Fellow	
Girls' Day School Trust	2016	Alumna of the Year	
Rose Bruford College	2011	Honorary Fellow	
University of Huddersfield	2024	Doctor of the University (Hon DUniv)	

== Other honours ==
- Beavan was appointed an Officer of the Order of the British Empire (OBE) in the 2017 New Year Honours for services to drama production.
- Beavan was made a Royal Designer for Industry (RDI) by the Royal Society of Arts in 2022.
