= The Masters of Disaster =

1986 film

- Produced by: Sonya Friedman; P Wetmore Kellar; Pat Wetmore
- Distributed by: Indiana University Audio-Visual Center
- Release date: 1986
- Country: United States
- Language: English

The Masters of Disaster is a 1986 American short documentary film produced by Sonya Friedman. It was nominated for an Academy Award for Best Documentary Short.

The documentary focuses on a group of inner city children learning how to play chess. They prove adept at the game, going to a tournament and even getting to meet Pres. Ronald Reagan.
