= John Bright (costume designer) =

British costume designer (born 1940)

John Bright OBE
- Born: John Myles Milton Bright; 7 March 1940 (age 86)
- Occupation: Costume designer
- Years active: 1965–present

John Myles Milton Bright OBE (born 7 March 1940) is a British costume designer. He is particularly known for his collaboration with Jenny Beavan on creating the costumes for Merchant Ivory Productions, and as the founder of Cosprop costume house.

Bright has been nominated for the Academy Award for Best Costume Design six times, winning for A Room with a View (1985).

== Charity work ==
In 2022, Bright set up The Bright Foundation, an arts education charity to provide access to the arts for children living in and around Hastings, East Sussex. The organization operates out of two venues, including the Barn Theatre and Museum and the Benbow Arts Space. The former venue features a barn-converted children's theatre and workshop studio, alongside a museum and exhibition space showcasing Bright's collection of period toys, puppets, and theatre sets, while the latter venue is located in the heart of St Leonards-on-Sea and is a creative learning hub dedicated to the art of filmmaking, where young people can discover their passion, develop skills and begin their journey into the film industry. The Foundation offers free access to both venues to schools and community groups.

== Selected filmography ==
Year	Title	Director	Notes
1984	The Bostonians	James Ivory	with Jenny Beavan
1985	A Room with a View	James Ivory	with Jenny Beavan
1987	Maurice	James Ivory	with Jenny Beavan
1988	The Deceivers	Nicholas Meyer	with Jenny Beavan
1990	Mountains of the Moon	Bob Rafelson	with Jenny Beavan
1991	White Fang	Randal Kleiser	with Jenny Beavan
1992	Howards End	James Ivory	with Jenny Beavan
1993	The Remains of the Day	James Ivory	with Jenny Beavan
1995	Jefferson in Paris	James Ivory	with Jenny Beavan
1995	Sense and Sensibility	Ang Lee	with Jenny Beavan
1996	Twelfth Night	Trevor Nunn	
1999	The Last September	Deborah Warner	
1999	Onegin	Martha Fiennes	with Chloé Obolensky
2000	The Golden Bowl	James Ivory	
2002	The Magnificent Ambersons	Alfonso Arau	Television film
2005	The White Countess	James Ivory	
2019	Carmilla	Emily Harris	

== Awards and nominations ==
Award	Year (Note: Indicates the year of ceremony. Each year is linked to the article about the awards held that year, wherever possible.)	Category	Work	Result	Ref.
Academy Awards	1985	Best Costume Design	The Bostonians	Nominated	
Academy Awards	1987	Best Costume Design	A Room with a View	Won	
Academy Awards	1988	Best Costume Design	Maurice	Nominated	
Academy Awards	1993	Best Costume Design	Howards End	Nominated	
Academy Awards	1994	Best Costume Design	The Remains of the Day	Nominated	
Academy Awards	1996	Best Costume Design	Sense and Sensibility	Nominated	
British Academy Film Awards	1985	Best Costume Design	The Bostonians	Nominated	
British Academy Film Awards	1987	Best Costume Design	A Room with a View	Won	
British Academy Film Awards	1993	Best Costume Design	Howards End	Nominated	
British Academy Film Awards	1996	Best Costume Design	Sense and Sensibility	Nominated	
Satellite Awards	2005	Best Costume Design	The White Countess	Nominated	

== Other honours ==
- Bright was appointed an Officer of the Order of the British Empire (OBE) in the 2024 Birthday Honours for services to costume design and to heritage.
