= Crimes of the Heart (film) =

1986 film directed by Bruce Beresford

- Theatrical release poster
- Directed by: Bruce Beresford
- Screenplay by: Beth Henley
- Based on: Crimes of the Heart by Beth Henley
- Produced by: Freddie Fields
- Starring: Diane Keaton; Jessica Lange; Sissy Spacek; Sam Shepard; Tess Harper; David Carpenter; Hurd Hatfield
- Cinematography: Dante Spinotti
- Edited by: Anne Goursaud
- Music by: Georges Delerue
- Distributed by: De Laurentiis Entertainment Group
- Release date: December 12, 1986
- Running time: 105 minutes
- Country: United States
- Language: English
- Budget: $20 million
- Box office: $22.9 million

Crimes of the Heart is a 1986 American independent Southern Gothic black comedy-drama film directed by Bruce Beresford from a screenplay written by Beth Henley adapted from her Pulitzer Prize-winning 1979 play. It stars Diane Keaton, Jessica Lange, Sissy Spacek, Sam Shepard, Tess Harper, and Hurd Hatfield. The film's narrative follows the Magrath sisters, Babe, Lenny and Meg, who reunite in their family home in Mississippi after the former is arrested for shooting her husband. Each sister is forced to face the consequences of the "crimes of the heart" she has committed.

Crimes Of The Heart was theatrically released by De Laurentiis Entertainment Group on December 12, 1986. It received positive reviews with critics praising its screenplay and performances (most notably Spacek's), but was a box office disappointment; grossing $22.9 million on a $20 million budget. The film received three nominations at the 59th Academy Awards: Best Actress (for Spacek), Best Supporting Actress (for Harper), and Best Adapted Screenplay. At the 44th Golden Globe Awards, it received a nomination for the Best Motion Picture – Musical or Comedy, with Spacek winning Best Actress – Musical or Comedy.

== Plot ==
The eccentric Magrath sisters—Lenny, Meg, and Rebecca "Babe"—reunite at their family home in Hazlehurst, Mississippi on Lenny's birthday, after Babe shoots and seriously injures her abusive husband, Zackery Botrelle. The three sisters were raised by Old Granddaddy after their mother committed suicide by hanging herself and the family's cat. Lenny is a wallflower who bemoans her shriveled ovary and has lived largely a life of solitude in the familial home caring for Granddaddy, while Babe married and moved in with the wealthy Zackery. The egocentric Meg is the only of the siblings to have left Hazlehurst, having ended her relationship with Doc Porter and relocated to Los Angeles to pursue a career as a singer, though she has kept her lack of success and a subsequent nervous breakdown a secret from her sisters.

Lenny fears that Babe will be convicted for shooting Zackery and suspects she may be mentally ill, while Meg presumes Babe must have had a valid reason for committing the crime. After Lenny learns that Old Granddaddy has just suffered a stroke in the hospital, Babe is released to her sisters from the county jail. Meg confides in Babe that she believes that Lenny is a virgin spinster, but Babe reveals to her that Lenny briefly had a boyfriend who left her upon finding out about her missing ovary.

Barnette Lloyd, an attorney hired to represent Babe, visits the house and speaks with Meg while Babe listens from a roof tower. Barnette suggests that Babe claim self-defense or temporary insanity, and shows Meg photographs from the hospital showing Babe seeking treatment for Zackery's physical abuse. Later, Babe admits to Meg that, due to her unfulfilling marriage to Zackery, Babe had carried on a romantic affair with a Willie Jay, a teenage African American boy. When confronted by Zackery, Babe shot him with the pistol before preparing herself lemonade.

Meg visits Old Granddaddy at the hospital and regales him with stories about her career in Hollywood, but Lenny is skeptical. Lenny, who feels Meg has always received preferential treatment, vents to Babe, who reminds her that Meg was the one who found their mother's dead body. Meg later admits to Lenny that her stories to Old Granddaddy were fabricated. Lenny becomes increasingly angry with Meg after finding that she carelessly took a bite out of every chocolate in a box of Lenny's birthday candy. When Lenny criticizes her, Meg insinuates that Lenny is jealous of her romantic life.

Doc Porter arrives at the house and he and Meg spend the evening together on a lakeshore, drinking bourbon and reminiscing about their last date. Meg eventually admits to Doc Porter that her career in Hollywood has been a failure. Simultaneously, Barnette visits the house and shocks Babe with sexual photographs of her and Willie together which Zackery's sister, Lucille, has procured from a private detective she hired to stalk Babe. Lenny is awoken by Babe's vocal reaction, but her attention is diverted by a phone call from the hospital notifying her that Old Granddaddy has slipped into a coma. Babe and Lenny keep vigil at Granddaddy's hospital bed overnight.

In the morning, a chipper Meg returns home to find the dejected Babe and Lenny seated over breakfast. Meg assures her sisters that she plans on telling Granddaddy the truth about her life in Hollywood, even if it "sends him into a coma". Lenny and Babe burst into laughter before informing Meg that Granddaddy actually is comatose. Later, Babe shows Meg the incriminating photographs of her with Willie. Barnette arrives shortly after, having negotiated with Zackery to drop charges against Babe out of fear that the public will perceive the affair as a poor reflection of Zackery's manhood.

Shortly after, Lenny summons the courage to call her ex-boyfriend and arrange a reunion. Meanwhile, Babe receives a surprise call from Zackery who threatens to have her institutionalized, and feels her only recourse is to commit suicide like her mother. She unsuccessfully attempts to hang herself from a chandelier upstairs. Dragging the ceiling fixture behind her, she considering stabbing herself in the kitchen before putting her head in the oven. She is narrowly saved by Meg, who stumbles upon the scene. As Meg revives her, Babe realizes why their mother also hanged the family cat: She did not want to die alone. Later that morning, Meg and Babe surprise Lenny with a birthday cake.

== Cast ==
- Diane Keaton as Lenora Josephine "Lenny" Magrath
  - Eleanor Eagle as Little Lenny
- Jessica Lange as Margaret "Meg" Magrath
  - Jessica Ezzell as Little Meg
- Sissy Spacek as Rebecca "Babe" Magrath Botrelle
  - Natalie Anderson as Little Babe
- Sam Shepard as Doc Porter
- Tess Harper as Chick Boyle
- Hurd Hatfield as Old Granddaddy
- David Carpenter as Barnette Lloyd
- Beeson Carroll as Zackery Botrelle
- Jean Willard as Lucille Botrelle
- Tom Mason as Uncle Watson
- Gregory Travis as Willie Jay
- Annie McKnight as Annie May Jenkis
- Connie Adams as Zackery's concubine
- Robert J. Maxwell as Bus Passenger

== Reception ==
=== Box office ===
The film opened on 246 screens in the US and earned $1,402,921 on its opening weekend. It eventually grossed $22,905,522 in the United States and Canada.

=== Critical reception ===
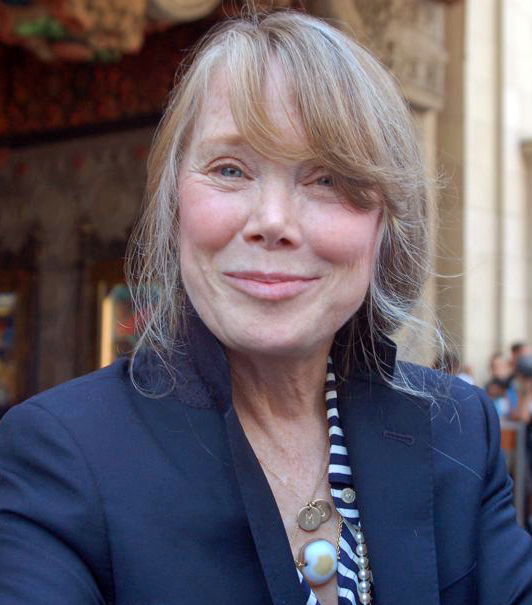
Sissy Spacek's performance received widespread critical acclaim, earning her the Golden Globe Award for Best Actress – Motion Picture Comedy or Musical, in addition to a nomination for the Academy Award for Best Actress.

Crimes Of The Heart received positive reviews among critics, with Spacek's performance being widely highlighted and lauded. Roger Ebert of the Chicago Sun-Times called the film "that most delicate of undertakings: a comedy about serious matters. It exists somewhere between parody and melodrama, between the tragic and the goofy. There are moments when the movie doesn't seem to know where it's going, but for once that's a good thing because the uncertainty almost always ends with some kind of a delightful, weird surprise. The underlying tone ... is a deep, abiding comic affection, a love for these characters who survive in the middle of a thicket of Southern Gothic clichés and archetypes."

Rita Kempley of The Washington Post described it as "Hannah and Her Sisters with a southern accent, a lilting gingerbread gothic with Diane Keaton, Sissy Spacek and Jessica Lange ding-a-linging harmoniously as Dixieland belles" and added, "Playwright Beth Henley has no dire message for us, but her adaptation is nicely restructured, glib as all get-out and character-wise ... The powerhouse performances are directed by Bruce Beresford, who maintains balance among the actresses and keeps a lovely tone and smooth pace. As with his critically acclaimed Tender Mercies, the Australian director again looks at American types with a fresh eye."

Vincent Canby of The New York Times disliked the film, though he conceded "it's not really the fault of the actresses. The casting sounds ideal until you see them together. Their strong, highly individualized presences simply cannot disappear into the texture of the play, which is as spare as a George Price cartoon, and as packed with eccentric details. Under Mr. Beresford's direction, these details aren't seen out of the corner of the eye but in the same, larger-than-life close-ups that destroy any sense of an ensemble performance by the actresses."

Crimes of the Heart currently holds an 82% rating on Rotten Tomatoes based on 22 reviews. Metacritic, which uses a weighted average, assigned the film a score of 58 out of 100, based on 13 critics, indicating "mixed or average" reviews.

== Accolades ==
Award	Category	Nominee(s)	Result
Academy Awards
Academy Awards	Best Actress	Sissy Spacek	Nominated
Academy Awards	Best Supporting Actress	Tess Harper	Nominated
Academy Awards	Best Adapted Screenplay	Beth Henley	Nominated
Golden Globe Awards	Best Motion Picture – Musical or Comedy	Freddie Fields	Nominated
Golden Globe Awards	Best Actress – Musical or Comedy	Sissy Spacek	Won
Kansas City Film Critics Circle	Best Actress	Sissy Spacek	Won
New York Film Critics Circle Awards	Best Actress	Sissy Spacek	Won
