= New York Film Critics Circle Award for Best Cinematographer =

The New York Film Critics Circle Award for Best Cinematographer is one of the annual awards given by the New York Film Critics Circle.

== Winners ==
=== 1980s ===
Year	Cinematographer(s)	Film
1980	Ghislain Cloquet and Geoffrey Unsworth	Tess
1981	David Watkin	Chariots of Fire
1982	Néstor Almendros	Sophie's Choice
1983	Gordon Willis	Zelig
1984	Chris Menges	The Killing Fields
1985	David Watkin	Out of Africa
1986	Tony Pierce-Roberts	A Room with a View
1987	Vittorio Storaro	The Last Emperor
1988	Henri Alekan	Wings of Desire
1989	Ernest R. Dickerson	Do the Right Thing

=== 1990s ===
Year	Cinematographer(s)	Film
1990	Vittorio Storaro	The Sheltering Sky
1991	Roger Deakins	Barton Fink
1992	Jean Lépin	The Player
1993	Janusz Kamiński	Schindler's List
1994	Stefan Czapsky	Ed Wood
1995	Lü Yue	Shanghai Triad
1996	Robby Müller	Breaking the Waves
1996	Robby Müller	Dead Man
1997	Roger Deakins	Kundun
1998	John Toll	The Thin Red Line
1999	Freddie Francis	The Straight Story

=== 2000s ===
Year	Cinematographer(s)	Film
2000	Peter Pau	Crouching Tiger, Hidden Dragon
2001	Christopher Doyle and Pin Bing Lee	In the Mood for Love
2002	Edward Lachman	Far from Heaven
2003	Harris Savides	Elephant
2003	Harris Savides	Gerry
2004	Christopher Doyle	Hero
2005	Christopher Doyle, Lai Yiu Fai, and Kwan Pun Leung	2046
2006	Guillermo Navarro	Pan's Labyrinth
2007	Robert Elswit	There Will Be Blood
2008	Anthony Dod Mantle	Slumdog Millionaire
2009	Christian Berger	The White Ribbon

=== 2010s ===
Year	Cinematographer(s)	Film
2010	Matthew Libatique	Black Swan
2011	Emmanuel Lubezki	The Tree of Life
2012	Greig Fraser	Zero Dark Thirty
2013	Bruno Delbonnel	Inside Llewyn Davis
2014	Darius Khondji	The Immigrant
2015	Edward Lachman	Carol
2016	James Laxton	Moonlight
2017	Rachel Morrison	Mudbound
2018	Alfonso Cuarón	Roma
2019	Claire Mathon	Portrait of a Lady on Fire

=== 2020s ===
Year	Cinematographer(s)	Film
2020	Shabier Kirchner	Small Axe
2021	Janusz Kamiński	West Side Story
2022	Claudio Miranda	Top Gun: Maverick
2023	Hoyte van Hoytema	Oppenheimer
2024	Jomo Fray	Nickel Boys
2025	Autumn Durald Arkapaw	Sinners

== See also ==
- Academy Award for Best Cinematography
