= Hullabaloo Over Georgie and Bonnie's Pictures =

1978 film by James Ivory

- Directed by: James Ivory
- Written by: Ruth Prawer Jhabvala
- Produced by: Ismail Merchant
- Starring: Peggy Ashcroft; Larry Pine; Saeed Jaffrey; Victor Banerjee; Aparna Sen
- Cinematography: Walter Lassally
- Edited by: Melvyn Bragg; Humphrey Dixon
- Music by: Vic Flick
- Distributed by: Contemporary Films Ltd. (1979 UK, theatrical); Criterion Collection (DVD)
- Release date: 1978 (TV premiere)
- Running time: 85 minutes
- Language: English

Hullabaloo Over Georgie and Bonnie's Pictures is a 1978 television film by Merchant Ivory Productions (written by Ruth Prawer Jhabvala, directed by James Ivory and produced by Ismail Merchant) set in India, starring UK stage actress Dame Peggy Ashcroft. It later received a limited theatrical release in 1979.

== Plot synopsis ==
A group of thieves descend upon an Indian palace to steal a collection of valuable paintings. The group includes Lady Gee (Peggy Ashcroft), a museum curator; the Maharaja (Victor Banerjee), his sister Bonnie (Aparna Sen) who wants to sell the paintings to Sotheby's, and a few others.
