= Debonair Dancers =

1986 film

- Produced by: Alison Nigh-Strelich
- Production company: Brooks Institute of Photography
- Distributed by: Filmakers Library
- Release date: 1986
- Country: Canada
- Language: English

Debonair Dancers is a 1986 short Canadian documentary film produced by Alison Nigh-Strelich. It was nominated for an Academy Award for Best Documentary Short.
