= Sam (1986 film) =

1986 film

- Directed by: Aaron D. Weisblatt
- Produced by: Aaron D. Weisblatt
- Distributed by: Direct Cinema
- Release date: 1986
- Running time: 22 minutes
- Country: United States
- Language: English

Sam is a 1986 American short documentary film directed by Aaron D. Weisblatt. It focuses on Sam Phelps, a New York State farmer who is opposed to the destruction of a nearby watershed, and argues for better planning and land management. The film was nominated for an Academy Award for Best Documentary Short.
