= Humphrey Dixon =

British film editor

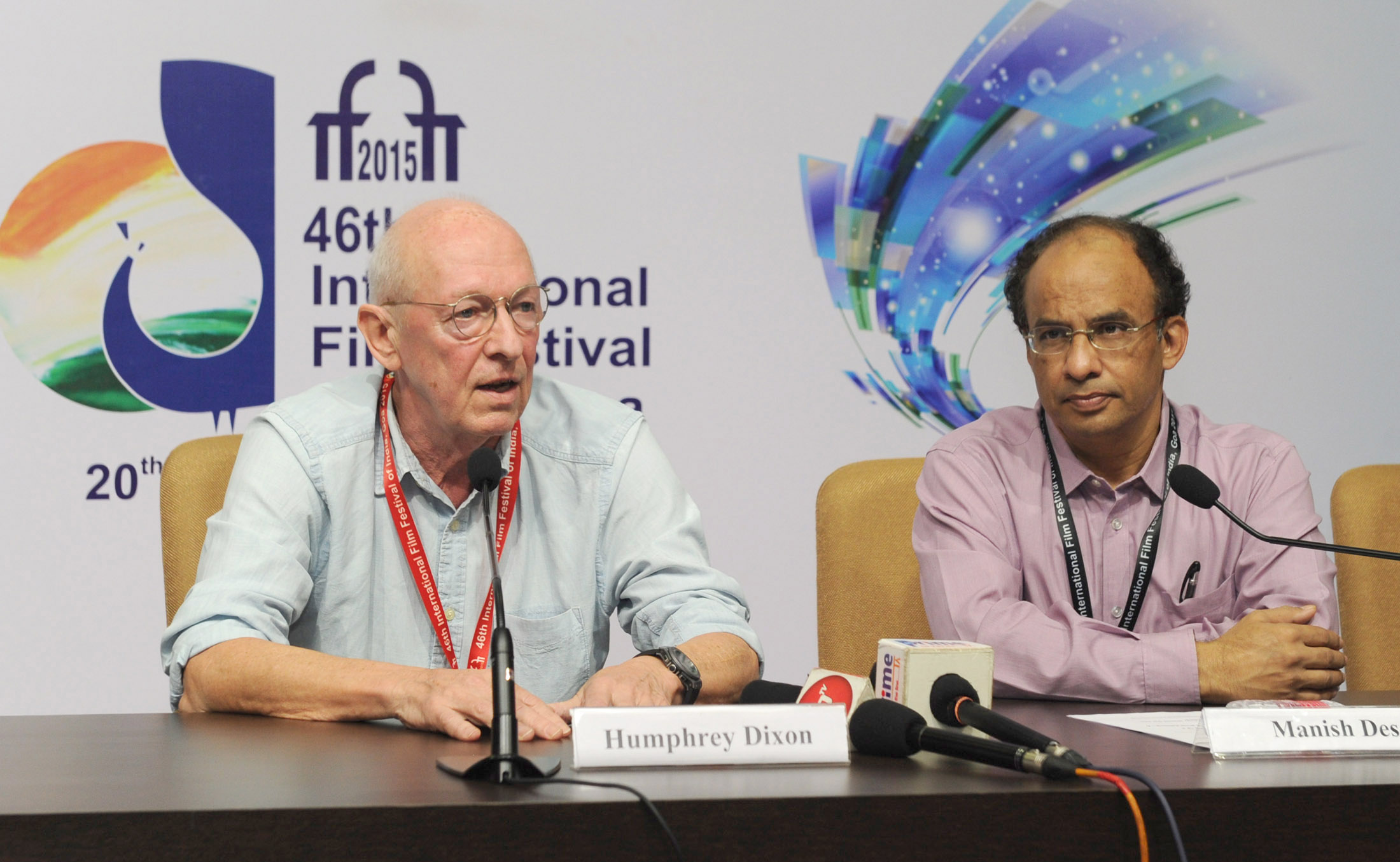
- Dixon, IFFI (2015)
- Occupation: Film editor

Humphrey Dixon is a British film editor.

Dixon began his career as assistant editor, later becoming a film editor for Merchant Ivory's Autobiography of a Princess (1974). In 1984, he directed Merchant Ivory's documentary The Wandering Company. He was nominated for the BAFTA Award for Best Editing for A Room with a View (1985).

Since the film Sirens (1994), he has collaborated with director John Duigan.

== Filmography ==
- Private Peaceful (2012)
- Aazaan (2011)
- My One and Only (2009)
- Wimbledon (2004)
- My House in Umbria (2003 TV movie)
- Evelyn (2002)
- Enemy at the Gates (2001)
- Paranoid (2000)
- Molly (1999)
- Dancing at Lughnasa (1998)
- Lawn Dogs (1997)
- The Leading Man (1996)
- The Proprietor (1996) - Editorial Consultant in London
- The Journey of August King (1995)
- A Simple Twist of Fate (1994)
- Sirens (1994)
- The Playboys (1992)
- Stepping Out (1991)
- Mr. & Mrs. Bridge (1990)
- Mister Johnson (1990)
- Crusoe (1989)
- A Room with a View (1985)
- Maria's Lovers (1984)
- Heat and Dust (1983)
- Quartet (1981)
- The Europeans (1979)
- Hullabaloo Over Georgie and Bonnie's Pictures (1978 TV movie)
- East of Elephant Rock (1977)
- Roseland (1977)
- Sweet Sounds (1976 documentary short)
- The Song Remains the Same (1976)
- Autobiography of a Princess (1975)
- The Guru (1969) - Assistant Editor
