= Elio Altamura =

Italian art director

- Died: 2004
- Occupation: Art director

Elio Altamura (died 2004) was an Italian art director. He won an Oscar in the category Best Art Direction for the film A Room with a View.

== Selected filmography ==
- A Room with a View (1985)
