= Ray Beckett (sound engineer) =

British sound engineer

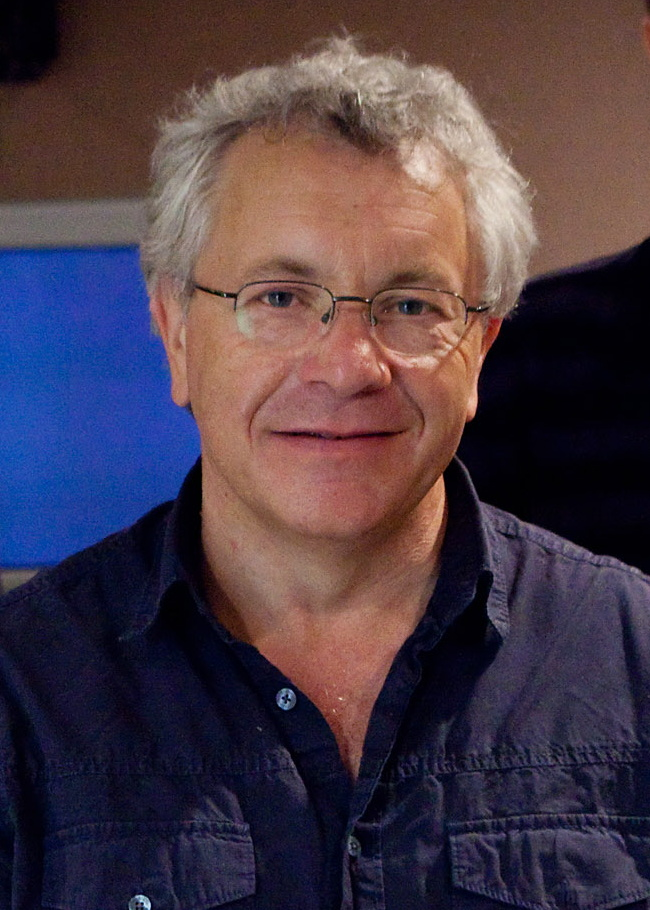
- Becket in 2010
- Occupation: Sound engineer
- Years active: 1977-present

Ray Beckett is a British sound engineer. He won an Academy Award in the category Best Sound Mixing for the film The Hurt Locker. He has worked on over 40 films since 1977.

== Selected filmography ==
- The Hurt Locker (2009)
- Coriolanus (2011)
- Zero Dark Thirty (2012)
