= Gianni Quaranta =

Italian production designer and art director (1943–2025)

- Born: 30 August 1943; Arsiè, Italy
- Died: 14 September 2025 (aged 82); Rome, Italy
- Occupations: Production designer, art director
- Years active: 1971–2025

Gianni Quaranta (30 August 1943 – 14 September 2025) was an Italian production designer and art director. He was nominated for the Academy Award for Best Art Direction and won the BAFTA Award for Best Production Design and the Nastro d'Argento for Best Production Design for La Traviata (1983). He won the Oscar for Best Art Direction for the film A Room with a View.

Quaranta died in Rome on 14 September 2025, at the age of 82.
