= Suzanne M. Benson =

American visual effects artist

Suzanne M. Benson is a visual effects producer born in 1958. She studied visual effects at the University of Arizona. She is best known for her work in Creature, Aliens, Spy Hard and Street Fighter. In 1987, she became the first woman to win an Oscar for special effects work in recognition for her work on the 1986 film Aliens. The film also won a BAFTA for special effects and a Saturn Award.

== Filmography ==
Her first work came on Slapstick of Another Kind (1982) where she worked as a production secretary. Benson’s next project came in 1984 as an associate visual producer on the film City Limits. She next worked on Creature, which was released in 1985. Meanwhile, she was also hard at work on Aliens, the sequel to the 1979 hit, Alien. Upon its release in 1986, Aliens not only garnered attention for its stellar acting performances and directing, but also for the groundbreaking special effects used in the film. For her work on the film, Benson was awarded an Academy Award in 1987. She followed up Aliens, with work on Street Fighter (1994) and Spy Hard (1996), before retiring from the industry in 1997.

== L.A. Effects Group ==
For most of her career, Benson worked for the L.A. Effects Group. The L.A. Effects Group was founded in 1983 by a group of prominent visual effect specialists working in Hollywood. Many of Benson's more prominent credits come from her time at the L.A. Effects Group. She joined the group between 1983 and 1984, working on the groups first film Creature, tied on as a visual effects producer. Following the release of Creature, the group was hired to handle the special effects to the 1986 film Aliens. She worked as a visual effects producer alongside Robert Skotak, Stan Winston, and John Richardson.

== Aliens ==
Benson is best known for her work in the 1986 film Aliens. Reviews of its use of puppets and props refer to it as the most advanced and detail oriented as the reviewers had ever seen in their cinematic careers, resulting in excellent reviews for the film overall. Critics also praise its use of figurines and miniatures to make scenes appear much larger on screen by using rear projection, mirrors, beam splitters, and camera splits. This advanced special effects work was seen as creative and novel for the time period. The special effects team also produced alien suits that were more flexible and more life-like compared to the ones used in the previous film. Mannequins were used when human actors were not an option, and these mannequins were able to be bent into positions not achievable by an actor. It was also possible for them to be blown up to simulate a gunshot wound to an extraterrestrial being. In 1986, when the film was released, these effects were viewed as the most advanced special effects to date.

== Awards ==
- 1987: Academy Award For Best Visual Effects: Aliens
- 1987: BAFTA For Best Visual Effects: Aliens
