= Brian Ackland-Snow =

English production designer

- Born: 31 March 1940; London, England
- Died: 30 March 2013 (aged 72)
- Occupation: Production designer
- Years active: 1962-2002

Brian Ackland-Snow (31 March 1940 – 30 March 2013) was an English production designer. He won an Oscar in the category Best Art Direction for the film A Room with a View. He also won an Emmy for best art direction for a miniseries or special in 1995 for Scarlett on CBS. His son, Andrew Ackland-Snow, went on to become an art director in films.

== Selected filmography ==
- A Room with a View (1985)
