= Sonya Friedman =

American psychologist (born 1936)

- Born: 1936 (age 89–90)
- Education: Brooklyn College; Wayne State University
- Occupation: Psychologist

Sonya Friedman (born 1936) is an American psychologist, author, and former television host. Growing up in a troubled home, she earned a Ph.D. in psychology and began hosting radio and television shows in the 1970s and 1980s to give self-help and psychological advice, particularly for women. Friedman has written several self-help books on topics involving women enhancing their own lives and their relationships and been a columnist for Ladies' Home Journal.

== Early life ==
Born in 1936, Friedman grew up in a troubled home with her mother who she described as having "never really developed as a person" and her stepfather who was frequently absent. Her birth parents had previously divorced in 1939 and her birth father was considered a stranger to her. She studied at Brooklyn College between the ages of 16 and 20, graduating in 1956. Friedman first met her future husband when they were in their teens on a beach in Brooklyn, New York. She later married a family doctor and they had a son and daughter together. They bought a home in Detroit in 1959. To help support her still-studying husband, she worked as a speech therapist. She later received a Masters of Psychology and doctorate in psychology from Wayne State University in 1967.

== Career ==
After finishing her degrees, Friedman began publishing a newspaper column in a local community paper. She then moved on to AM radio and television in Detroit. First beginning her television counseling career in the 1970s, she obtained a spot on ABC's Good Morning America. By 1976, she had become disillusioned with her position, thinking she was not yet good enough at her work for the special correspondent's role. Instead, she took a job as the call-in psychologist for the most popular such show in Detroit. Briefly in 1980, she was also the talk show segment host for Norman Lear's sitcom The Baxters. A television show for her titled Telling Secrets With Sonya was aired by the USA Network from 1982 until 1985. During this time, she was also continuing her private therapist practice in both Detroit and Los Angeles and maintaining her column in Ladies' Home Journal.

Friedman began hosting her own radio show twice a week in 1986 for ABC Talkradio as a radio psychologist replacement for Toni Grant. In March 1987, she was hired to host another television show of her own on CNN named Sonya Live, which aired for two hours every weekday. The show featured a number of different interviews, round table panel discussions, and other informational segments on news, business, and social topics. To facilitate the broadcast away from her home, she lived in an apartment in Los Angeles during the week and flew back to her home in Detroit during the weekends. Her radio show was removed from airing in September 1988 and replaced with other programming.

Friedman published what she referred to as the "last of my self-help books" in 1991 titled On a Clear Day You Can See Yourself. It wrapped up the information from her prior books, with Friedman saying she was "out of advice" and that it was "time for women to grow up". She quoted the statistic that 50% of women were becoming independent and living much of their lives without reliance on men, meaning that women had to take their adult lives into their own hands. She also recommended that all women should make their own totem, a collection of objects that represent themselves and important moments in their lives that they keep in a small package close to themselves. Friedman's totem includes objects on a charm necklace, representing themes of "herself, luck, God, her roots, and integrity".

In 1994, Sonya Live on CNN was replaced with Talk Back Live. She also published a new book in 1994 titled Secret Loves that featured interviews with over 100 women from a variety of education and economic levels, but who otherwise were the average representation of women in the country, those who were "your mothers, your grandmothers, your sisters and next-door neighbors". The thing that unified the women she interviewed was that they were all monogamous with two men at the same time.

== Awards and honors ==
At the 1984 Awards for Cablecasting Excellence, Friedman won best program hostess. In 1991, Friedman was awarded the first annual Star award from the American Women in Radio and Television. Two years later, she was awarded the Presidential Award of the American Psychological Association and given the America's Women of Distinction Award from the Crohn & Colitis Foundation.

== Books ==
- — (2004). Take It from Here: How to Get from Where You Are to Where You Want to Be. Kensington Books. p. 272. ISBN 9780758204912.
- —; Forsyth, Sondra (1994). Secret Loves: Women with Two Lives. Crown Publishing Group. p. 208. ISBN 9780517590522.
- —; Kettelhack, Guy (1991). On a Clear Day You Can See Yourself: Turning the Life You Have Into the Life You Want. Random House. p. 240. ISBN 9780345375971.
- — (1986). A Hero is More Than Just a Sandwich: How to Give Up Junk Food Love and Find a Naturally Sweet Man. G. P. Putnam's Sons. p. 249. ISBN 9780399132049.
- — (1985). Smart Cookies Don't Crumble: A Modern Woman's Guide to Living and Loving Her Own Life. G. P. Putnam's Sons. p. 252. ISBN 9780399130403.
- — (1983). Men Are Just Desserts: How Learning to Be a Woman with a Life of Your Own Can Enrich the Life You Share with a Man. Warner Books. p. 242.
