= Tony Pierce-Roberts =

British cinematographer

- Born: 24 December 1945 (age 80); Birkenhead, United Kingdom
- Years active: 1973–2014
- Spouse: Elizabeth Waller
- Children: 1

Anthony Pierce-Roberts (born 24 December 1945, in Birkenhead, England) is a British cinematographer.

== Filmography ==
=== Feature film ===
| Year | Title | Director |
|---|---|---|
| 1982 | Moonlighting | Jerzy Skolimowski |
| 1984 | A Private Function | Malcolm Mowbray |
| 1985 | A Room with a View | James Ivory |
| 1987 | A Tiger's Tale | Peter Douglas |
| 1989 | Out Cold | Malcolm Mowbray |
| 1989 | Slaves of New York | James Ivory |
| 1990 | Mr. & Mrs. Bridge | James Ivory |
| 1991 | White Fang | Randal Kleiser |
| 1992 | Howards End | James Ivory |
| 1993 | Splitting Heirs | Robert Young |
| 1993 | The Dark Half | George A. Romero |
| 1993 | The Remains of the Day | James Ivory |
| 1994 | The Client | Joel Schumacher |
| 1994 | Disclosure | Barry Levinson |
| 1995 | Haunted | Lewis Gilbert |
| 1996 | Surviving Picasso | James Ivory |
| 1997 | Jungle 2 Jungle | John Pasquin |
| 1998 | Paulie | John Roberts |
| 1998 | Something to Believe In | John Hough |
| 1999 | Asterix and Obelix vs. Caesar | Claude Zidi |
| 1999 | The Trench | William Boyd |
| 2000 | The Golden Bowl | James Ivory |
| 2001 | Kiss Kiss (Bang Bang) | Stewart Sugg |
| 2002 | The Importance of Being Earnest | Oliver Parker |
| 2003 | Underworld | Len Wiseman |
| 2004 | De-Lovely | Irwin Winkler |
| 2005 | Separate Lies | Julian Fellowes |
| 2005 | Doom | Andrzej Bartkowiak |
| 2006 | Home of the Brave | Irwin Winkler |
| 2007 | J'aurais voulu être un danseur | Alain Berliner |
| 2008 | Made of Honor | Paul Weiland |
| 2014 | Vampire Academy | Mark Waters |

=== Television ===
| Year | Title | Director | Notes |
|---|---|---|---|
| 1973–78 | Play for Today | Mike Leigh; Herbert Wise; Stephen Frears; Brian Gibson | 4 episodes (Including "Hard Labour") |
| 1978 | Everyman | | Episode "Paul's Children" |
| 1979 | Shoestring | Peter Smith | Episode "Listen to Me" |
| 1980 | BBC2 Playhouse | Peter Duffell | Episode Caught on a Train |
| 2002 | Dinotopia | Mario Philip Azzopardi; David Winning; Thomas J. Wright; Mike Fash | 6 episodes |

Miniseries

| Year | Title | Director | Notes |
|---|---|---|---|
| 1975 | Days of Hope | Ken Loach | With John Else |
| 1975 | The Fight Against Slavery | Christopher Ralling | Documentary-drama series |
| 1976 | The Glittering Prizes | Waris Hussein | Episode "A Country Life" |
| 1978 | Connections | Mick Jackson | Documentary series |
| 1979 | Tinker Tailor Soldier Spy | John Irvin | |
| 1982 | Nobody's Hero | John Goldschmidt | |
| 1988 | The Bourne Identity | Roger Young | |
| 2002 | Dinotopia | Marco Brambilla | |

TV movies

| Year | Title | Director | Notes |
|---|---|---|---|
| 1975 | Orders from Above | Robert Vas | Documentary film; With Malcolm Kipling and Bill Matthews |
| 1979 | Timothy West as Beecham | Robin Lough | |
| 1981 | The Good Soldier | Kevin Billington | |
| 1982 | A Voyage Round My Father | Alvin Rakoff | |
| 1982 | P'tang, Yang, Kipperbang | Michael Apted | |
| 1984 | The Cold Room | James Dearden | |
| 1989 | No Place Like Home | Lee Grant | |

== Awards and nominations ==
| Year | Award | Category | Title | Result | Ref. |
|---|---|---|---|---|---|
| 1986 | Academy Awards | Best Cinematography | A Room with a View | Nominated | |
| 1992 | Academy Awards | Best Cinematography | Howards End | Nominated | |
| 1986 | American Society of Cinematographers | Outstanding Cinematography | A Room with a View | Nominated | |
| 1992 | American Society of Cinematographers | Outstanding Cinematography | Howards End | Nominated | |
| 1986 | BAFTA Awards | Best Cinematography | A Room with a View | Nominated | |
| 1992 | BAFTA Awards | Best Cinematography | Howards End | Nominated | |
| 1993 | BAFTA Awards | Best Cinematography | The Remains of the Day | Nominated | |
| 1980 | British Academy Television Craft Awards | Best Film Cameramen | Tinker Tailor Soldier Spy | Won | |
| 1981 | British Academy Television Craft Awards | Best Film Cameramen | BBC2 Playhouse (For episode "Caught on a Train") | Won | |
| 1983 | British Academy Television Craft Awards | Best Film Cameramen | P'tang, Yang, Kipperbang / A Voyage with My Father | Nominated | |
| 1986 | British Society of Cinematographers | Best Cinematography | A Room with a View | Nominated | |
| 1992 | British Society of Cinematographers | Best Cinematography | Howards End | Won | |
| 1993 | Camerimage | Golden Frog | Howards End | Nominated | |
| 1986 | Evening Standard British Film Awards | Best Technical or Artistic Achievement | A Room with a View | Won | |
| 1986 | New York Film Critics Circle Awards | Best Cinematography | A Room with a View | Won | |
