= CCS =

CCS may refer to:

== Business and brands ==
- CC's, a corn chip brand
- CCS.com, a skateboard/snowboard brand and retailer
- Cross currency swap
- Circuit City Stores, an American electronics retail company

== Computer science ==
- Calculus of communicating systems, a modeling approach
- Coded character set, in which each character corresponds to a unique number
- Code Composer Studio, an integrated development environment for Texas Instruments processors
- Common-channel signaling, a method of transmitting control information
- complete corresponding source, a requirement for GNU General Public Licenses
- ACM Computing Classification System, for publications
- CeVIO Creative Studio, a speech and singing synthesis software
- Conventional Commits Specification

== Entertainment ==
- Cardcaptor Sakura, a manga and anime series
- CCS (band), also known as C.C.S., a British music group

== Education ==
- Common Core State Standards Initiative, a United States educational standards effort
- Carroll County Schools, in Mississippi's Carroll County School District
- Coast Christian Schools, now known as Valor Christian Academy
- College of Creative Studies, Santa Barbara, California
- College for Creative Studies, Detroit, Michigan
- Caroline Chisholm School, England
- Cowbridge Comprehensive School, Wales
- Calvary Christian School (Covington, Kentucky)
- Centre for China Studies, The Chinese University of Hong Kong, Hong Kong
- Cornway College a private, co-educational, day and boarding school in Zimbabwe
- Coventry Christian Schools
- Community Christian School (disambiguation)
- Casino Christian School, New South Wales
- Center for Cartoon Studies, an art institute
- Columbus Catholic Schools, Marshfield Wisconsin

== Energy ==
- Carbon capture and storage, a technology used to reduce CO_{2} emissions from facilities such as gas processing plants
- Copper-clad steel, a type of bimetallic conductor
- Combined Charging System, a connector standard for fast charging electric vehicles

== Gaming ==
- Cases Computer Simulations, a video strategy and war game company
- Candy Crush Saga, a puzzle video game

== Organisations ==
- Cabinet Committee on Security, in the Cabinet of India
- Canadian Cancer Society
- Canadian Cardiovascular Society
- Casualty Clearing Station, a medical facility operated by British Empire forces during World War I
- Ceylon Civil Service
- Centre for Civil Society
- China Communications Services
- China Classification Society
- Combined Chiefs of Staff, the supreme military command for the western Allies during World War II
- Comparative Cognition Society, a scientific society for the study of animal cognition and comparative psychology
- Computer Conservation Society
- Consumers Cooperative Services, a network of New York City consumer cooperatives founded in the 1920s
- Crippled Children Society, founded in New Zealand in 1935 by Alexander Gillies
- Crown Commercial Service, an executive agency and trading fund of the Cabinet Office of the UK Government
- Committee of Concerned Scientists, an organization supporting human rights of scientists around the world

== Places ==
- Abbreviation for Caracas, Venezuela
- IATA code for Simón Bolívar International Airport in Caracas, Venezuela
- Common Central Secretariat, New Delhi, India

== Science ==
- Cartesian coordinate system, a mathematical system
- Capsanthin/capsorubin synthase, an enzyme
- Cellular Confinement Systems (geocells), a honeycombed geosythethetic matrix filled with granular material
- Chinese Chemical Society (Taipei), a scholarly organization
- Chinese Chemical Society (Beijing), a scholarly organization
- Critical community size, a parameter used in vaccination and eradication campaigns
- Chemical formula for the compound thioxoethenylidene
- CCS (gene), a copper chaperone for superoxide dismutase
- Chronic Covid Syndrome, long-term medical symptoms
- Collision cross-section, a parameter in Ion mobility spectrometry

== Sports ==
- Canadian Cue Sport Association
- CC Sabathia (born 1980), American baseball player
- Cardiff City Stadium, in Wales
- CIF Central Coast Section, part of the California Interscholastic Federation
- Championship Cup Series, a motorcycle road racing sanctioning body
- Capital City Service, a football hooligan gang attached to Hibernian FC
- Collegiate Conference of the South, a US college sports conference
- Creamline Cool Smashers, a Filipino professional volleyball team
- IOC sport code for cross country skiing at the Winter Olympics

== Other uses ==
- Container closure system, the packaging components for a pharmaceutical dosage
- Critical code studies
- CYLD cutaneous syndrome, an inherited, familial disorder involving the development of multiple skin tumors
