= Educational institution =

Institution that provides education

An educational institution is a place where people of different ages gain an education, including preschools, childcare, primary-elementary schools, secondary-high schools, and universities. They provide a large variety of learning environments and learning spaces.

== Architecture ==
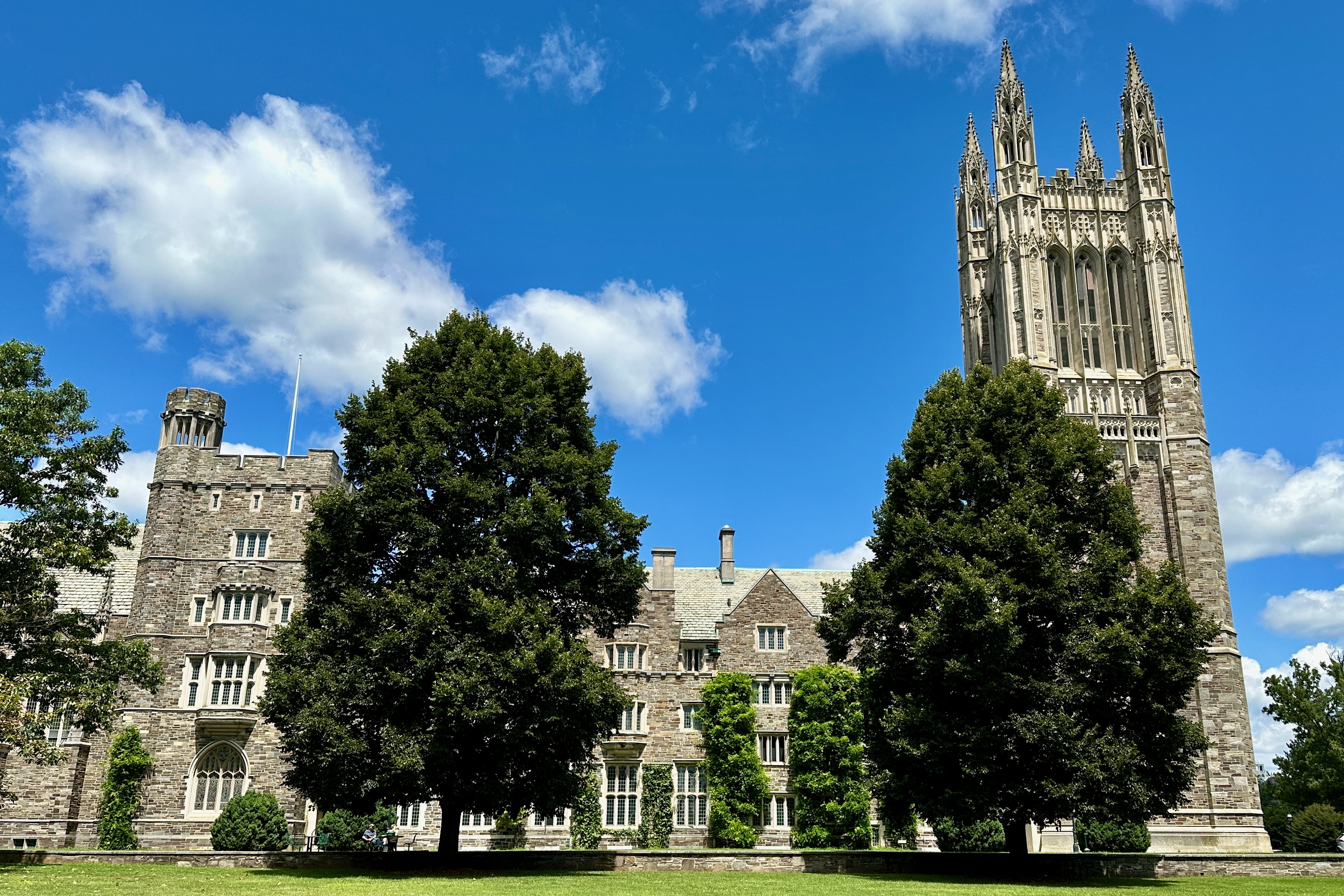
Princeton University Graduate College (1913), designed by Ralph Adams Cram in the Collegiate Gothic style

Educational architecture, also known as school architecture or school building design, is a specialized branch of commercial architecture where the building design is focused for the primary purpose of educational instruction, such as schools and universities, as well as other educational institutions. The design of a building can significantly influence the learning experience of students. Additionally, because schools are important sources of traffic, employment and community activities, school buildings often act as anchor institutions in neighborhoods or communities.

Various countries have gone through significant changes in philosophies associated with educational institutions, influenced by trends in investment by governments as well as larger changes in educational philosophy.

== Types of educational institution ==
Types of educational institution include:

=== Early childhood ===
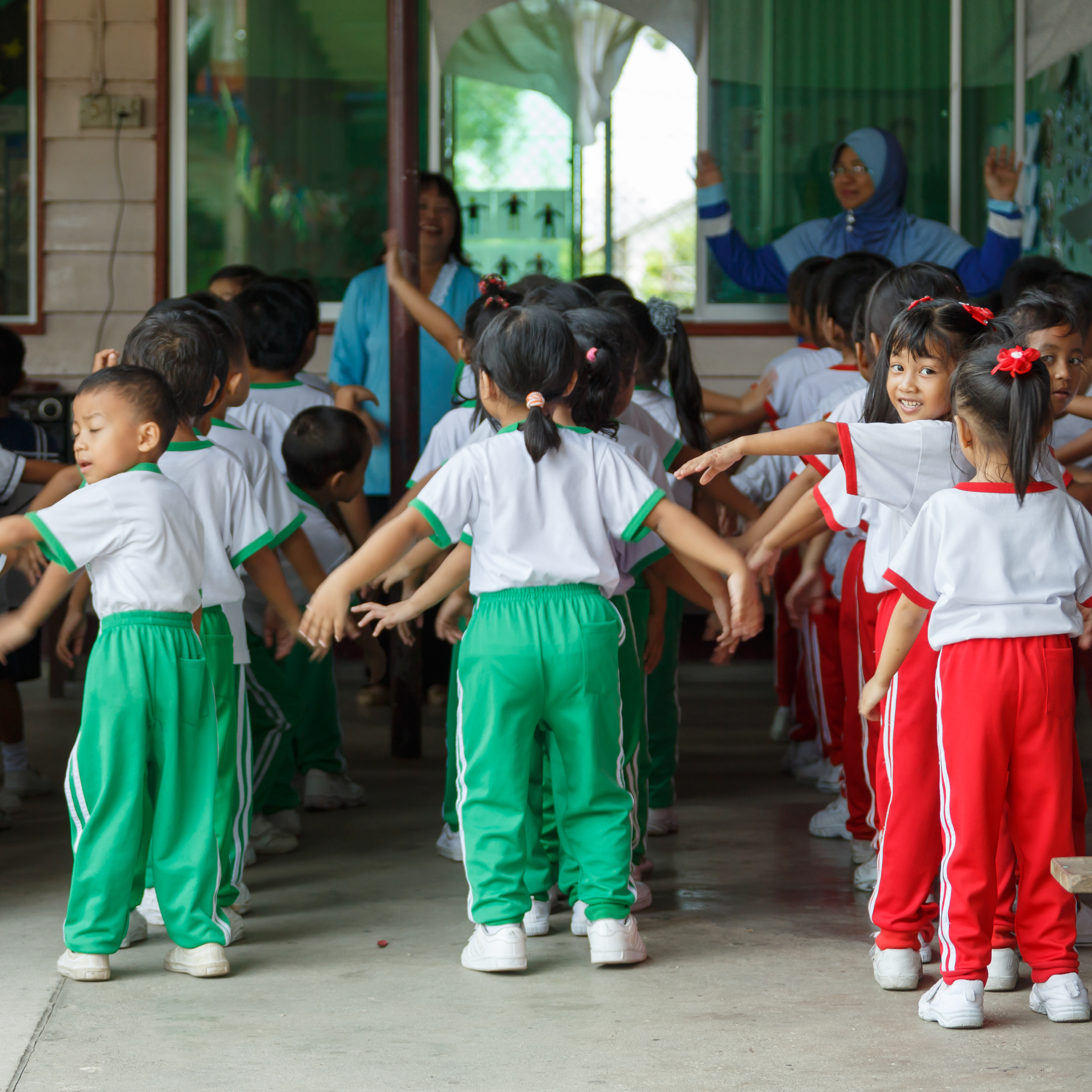
Preschoolers in Malaysia exercising

- Infant school
- Kindergarten
- Preschool or nursery

=== Primary ===
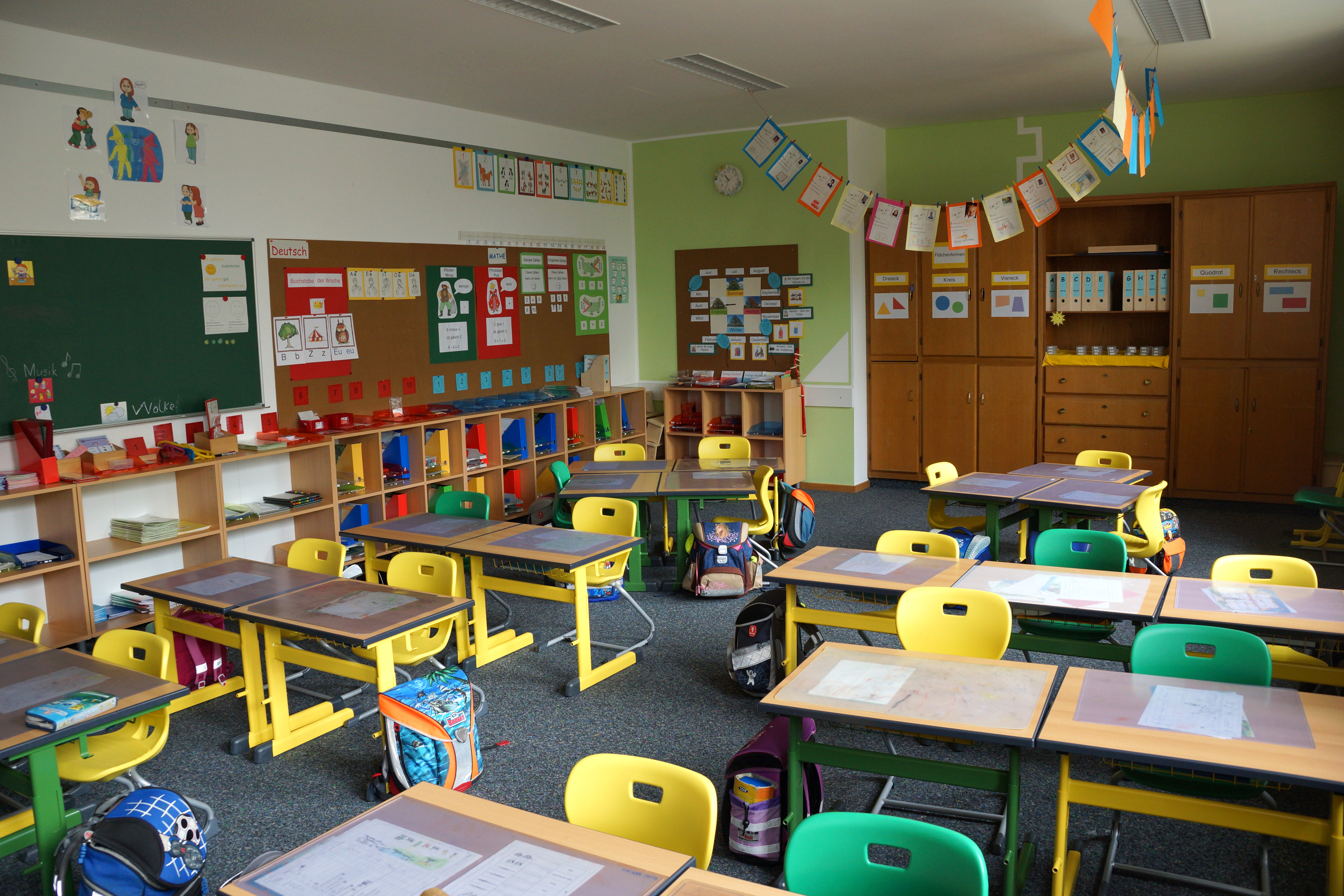
A classroom in a private Catholic elementary school in the private Catholic elementary school in Neumarkt in der Oberpfalz, Bavaria, Germany

- Comprehensive school
- Elementary, grade or primary school
- Junior school
- Middle school (partly)
- Preparatory school (United Kingdom)

=== Secondary ===
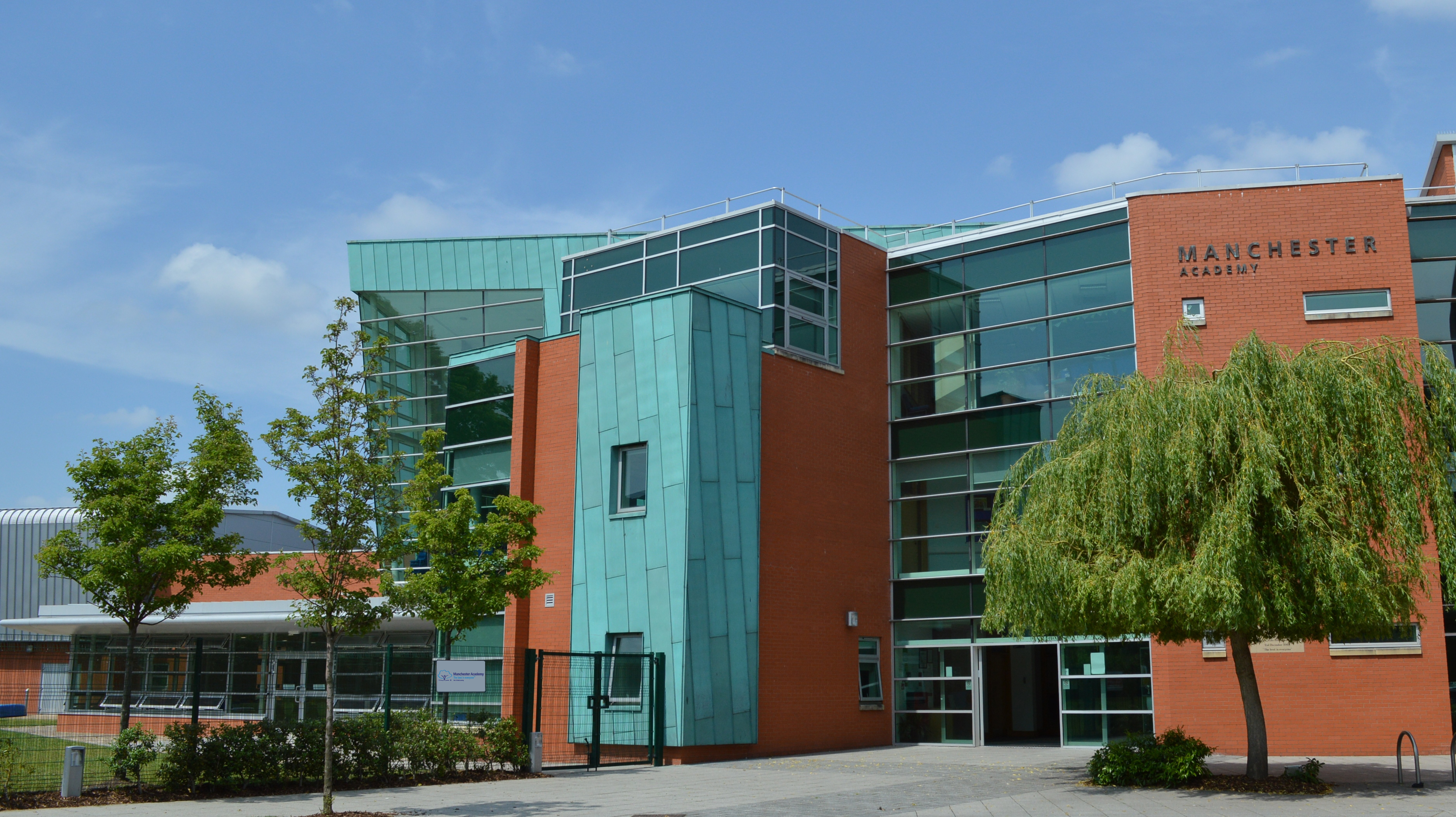
Manchester Academy, an English comprehensive school in Manchester

- Academy (English school)
- Adult high school
- Boarding school
- Collegiate institute
- Comprehensive school
- Comprehensive school (England and Wales)
- Grammar school
- Gymnasium (school)
- Hauptschule
- Independent school (UK)
- Middle school (partly)
- Military high school
- Minor seminary
- Realschule
- Secondary school or high school
- Staff college
- Studio school
- University technical college
- University-preparatory school
- Upper school

=== Further and higher education ===
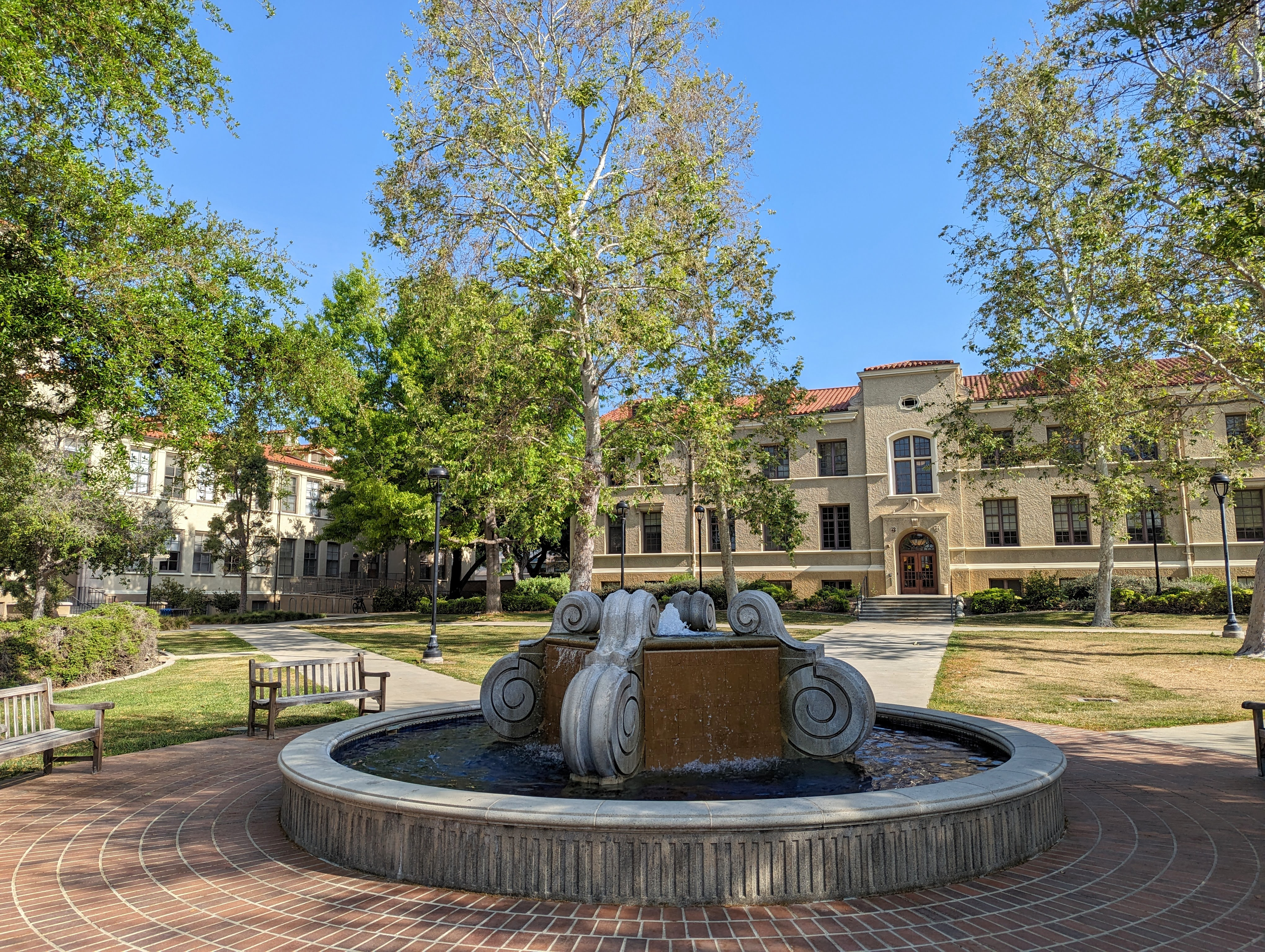
Pomona College, a liberal arts college in Southern California

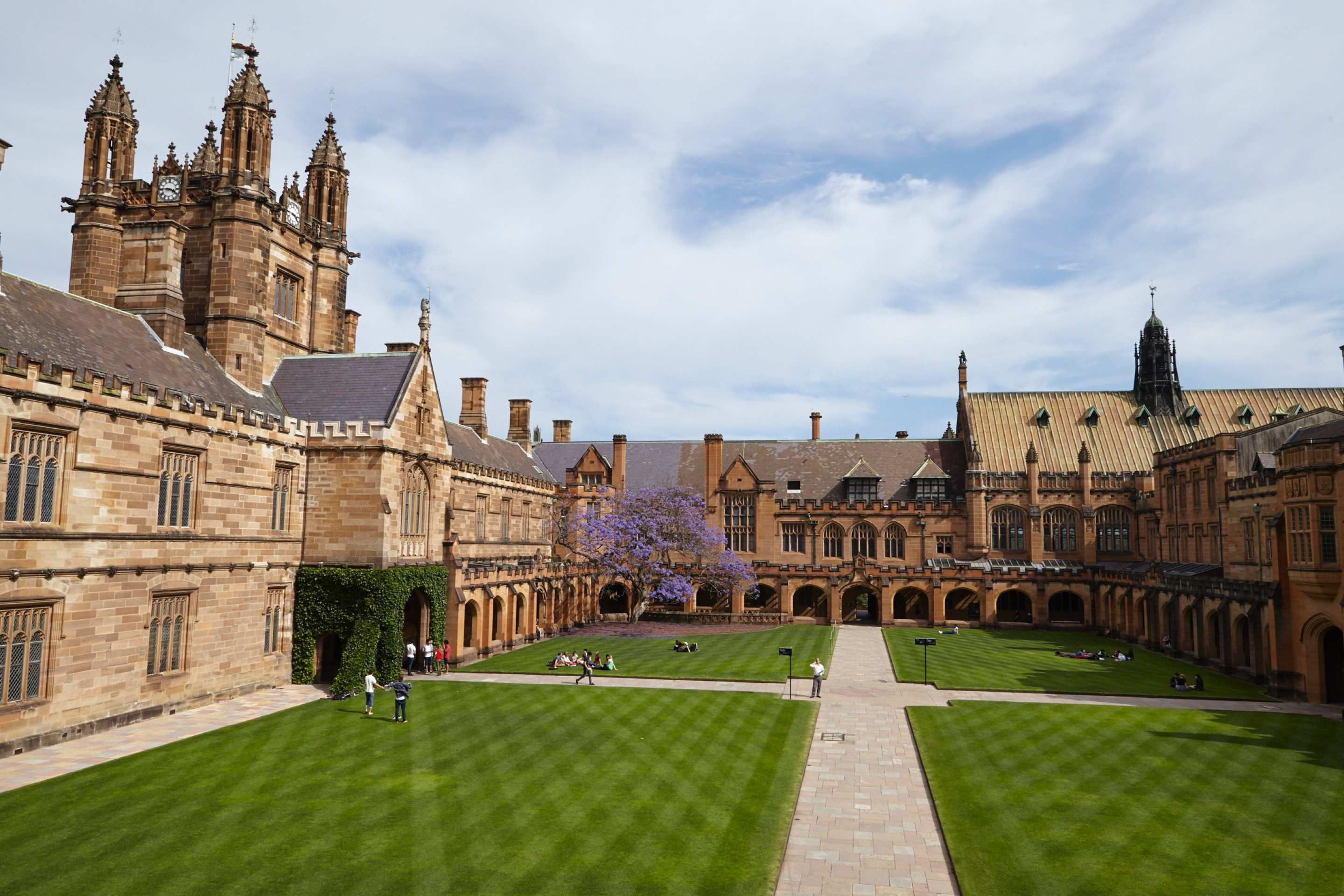
The University of Sydney, a public research university in Sydney

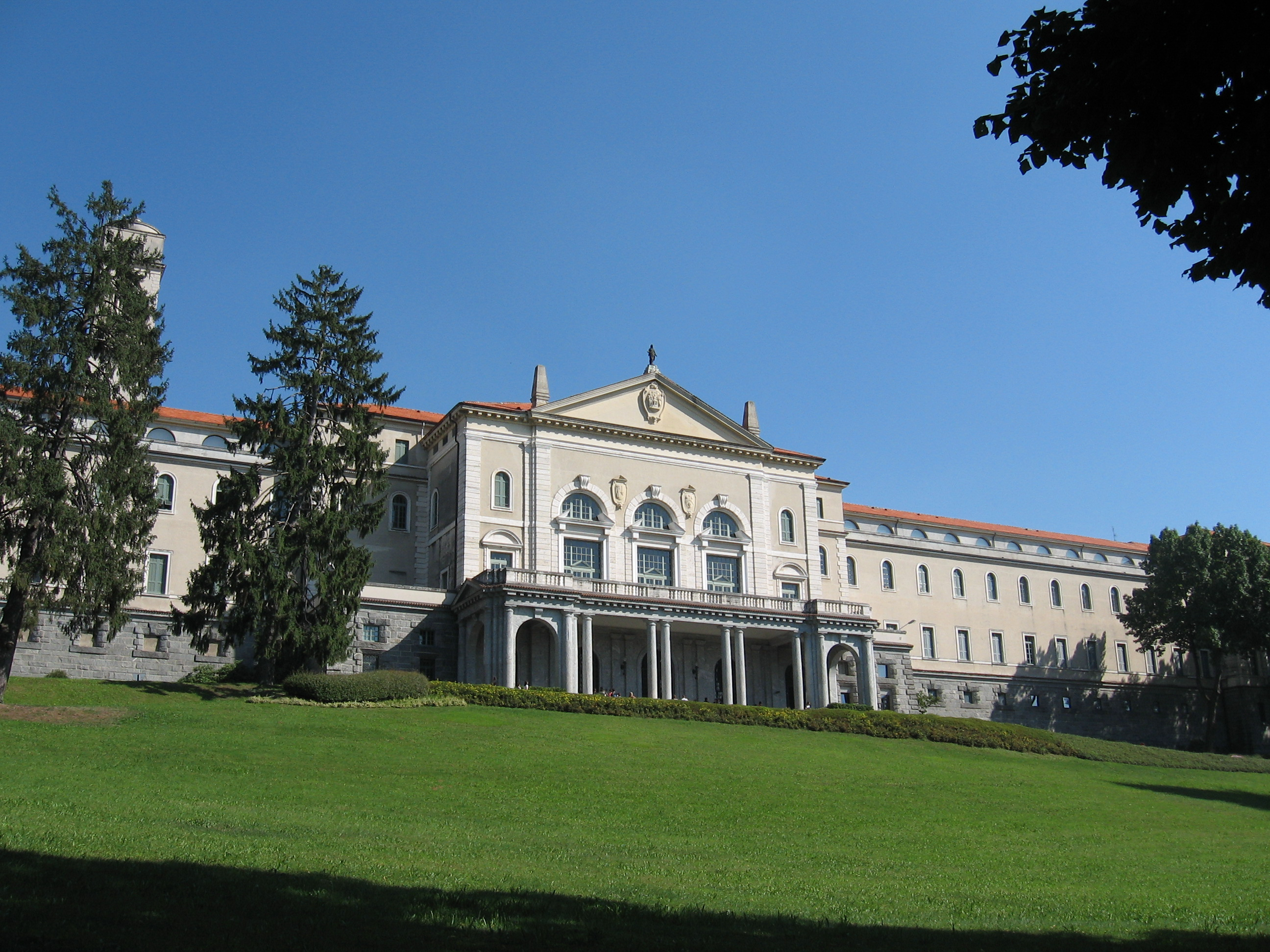
Seminary of the Roman Catholic Archdiocese of Milan

- Academy
- Art School
- Career college
- College
- Community college
- Corporate university
- Folk high school
- Graduate school
- Gurukula
- International university
- Jami'a
- Junior college
- Liberal arts college
- Local university
- Madrasah
- Maths school
- Medieval university
- Military academy
- Nizamiyya
- Private university
- Public university
- Research university
- Residential college
- Seminary
- Sixth form college
- Technical college or institute of technology
- Technical school
- University
- University college
- Upper division college
- Vocational university
- Yeshiva

=== Other ===
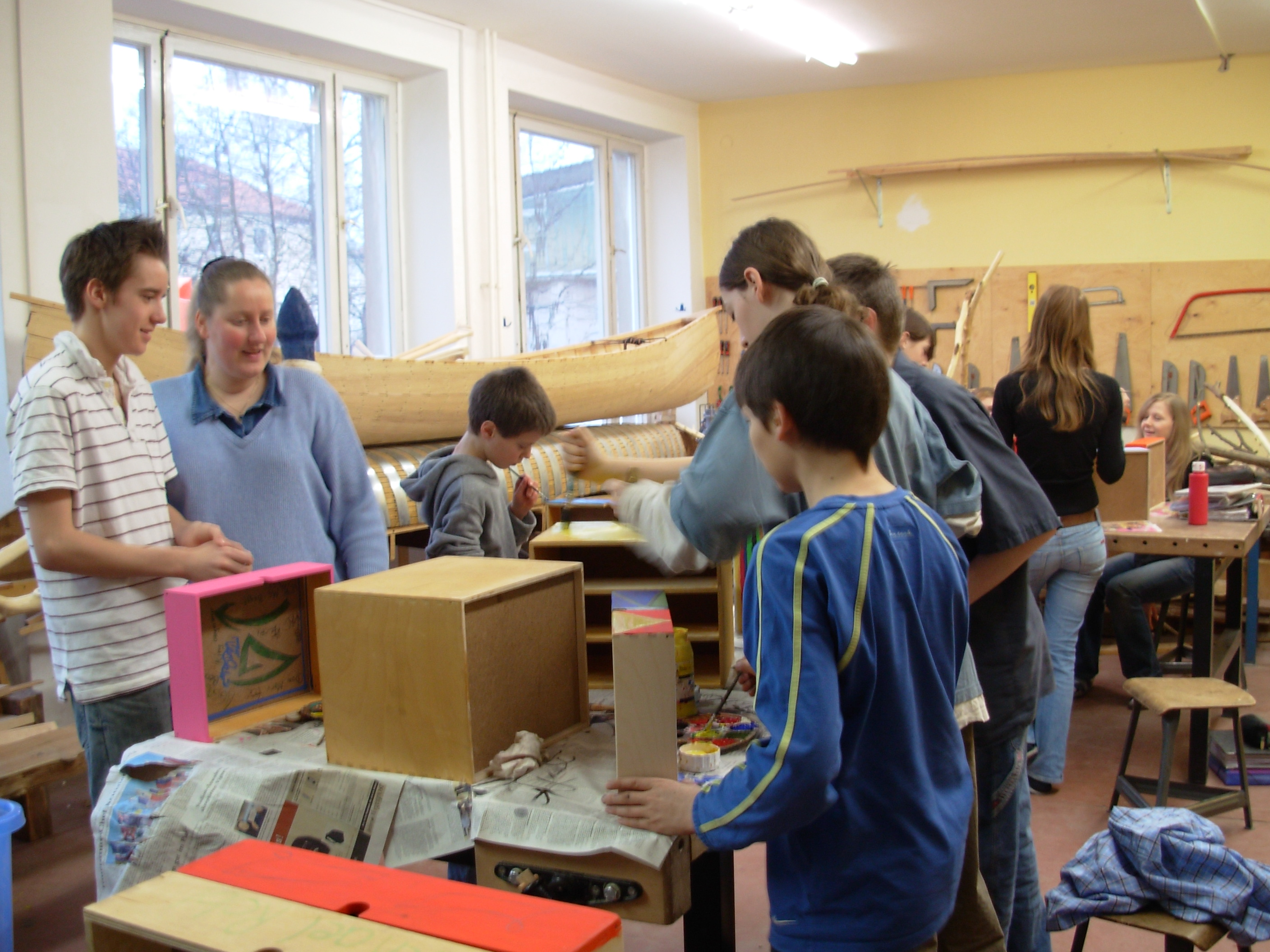
An art class at Montessori Oberschule Potsdam, a Montessori school in Potsdam, Brandenburg, Germany

- All-through school
- Alternative school
- Charter school
- Community school
- International school
- Laboratory school
- Language school
- Lyceum
- Magnet school
- Montessori school
- Music school
- One-room school
- Online school
- Private school
- Religious school
- Selective school
- Specialist school
- State school
- Sudbury school
- Waldorf school
- Tuition center

== See also ==
- Lists of schools
- Lists of universities and colleges
