= Community Christian School =

Community Christian School is the name of several private schools. These include

- Community Christian School (Georgia), in Stockbridge, Georgia
- Community Christian School (Bradenton, Florida)
- Community Christian School (Tallahassee, Florida)
- Community Christian School (Norman, Oklahoma)

== See also ==
- CCS (disambiguation)
- Christian school
- Community school (disambiguation)
