= Effects Associates =

Effects Associates is a physical-effects facility based in Pinewood Studios and one of the longest serving such companies in Europe. It is a division of the digital visual effects and post-production facility Cinesite (Europe) Ltd.

== History ==
Effects Associates was established in 1972 by a group of four British special effects supervisors, including Martin Gutteridge. Gutteridge bought out his partners by 1981 and in 1999 the company was purchased by Cinesite (Europe) Ltd. Together, the companies offer a full visual effects service.

Awards and nominations that Effects Associates and its affiliated supervisors have received include Emmy Award nominations for Hornblower series 2, Cleopatra, Ironclads and War and Remembrance; an Oscar for Alien (Special Effects Supervisor Nick Allder); Oscar and BAFTA nominations for Little Shop of Horrors; and a BAFTA award for The Fifth Element.

Directors Effects Associates have worked with include Richard Loncraine, Guillermo del Toro, Stanley Kubrick, Tim Burton, Ang Lee and Sydney Pollack.

== Services ==
Effects Associates houses one of the largest effects equipment-hire stores in Europe. They also provide special-effects services including pyrotechnics, atmospherics, special effects supervision and technicians, mechanical effects and maritime effects.

== Previous projects ==
- The Dark is Rising
- Blood and Chocolate
- The Da Vinci Code
- Wimbledon
- Hellboy
- Thunderbirds
- Blade II
- Enigma
- Eyes Wide Shut
- Notting Hill
- The Peacemaker
- Sense and Sensibility
- Santa Claus: The Movie
