= Community school =

Community school may refer to:

- Community school (England and Wales), a type of state-funded school in which the local education authority employs the school's staff, is responsible for the school's admissions and owns the school's estate
- Community school (Ireland), a type of secondary school funded directly by the state
- Community school (United States), a type of publicly funded school that serves as both an educational institution and a center of community life
- Full-service community schools in the United States
- Community school (international), a language school that teaches languages to its local community. Different from a Study Abroad School, i.e. a school that teaches the local language to international students.

== Individual schools ==
- Community Magnet Charter School, Los Angeles, California
- Community School (Sun Valley, Idaho)
- The Community School, Camden, Maine
- Community School (Teaneck, New Jersey)
- Community High School (Ann Arbor, Michigan)
- Community High School (Texas)
- Community High School (Teaneck, New Jersey)
- Community High School (West Chicago)
- The Community School (Decatur, Georgia)

== See also ==
- American Community School (disambiguation)
- Community High School (disambiguation)
- Community Christian School (disambiguation)
