= Community High School =

There are various Community High Schools throughout the world, including:

Iran

- Community School, Tehran

United Kingdom

- Cramlington Community High School, Northumberland, England

United States

- Community High School (West Chicago), Illinois
- Community High School (Ann Arbor, Michigan)
- Community High School (Teaneck, New Jersey)
- Community High School (Texas)
- Community High School (Tennessee)
- Forest Hill Community High School, West Palm Beach, Florida

== See also ==
- Community school (disambiguation)
- Community High School District 99, Illinois, US
