= Patrice M. Regnier =

American choreographer (born 1953)

Patrice Regnier
- Born: May 3, 1953 (age 73); Minneapolis
- Occupation: choreographer

Patrice M. Regnier (born May 3, 1953) is an American choreographer, director, producer and inventor. She is the developer of the TERP system, a patented and trademarked (Note: "US Patent 7853249 B2 Patrice M. Regnier "Systems and Methods for Choreographing Movement" Filed April 27, 2005, Application N° 11/116049 Published (issued) December 14, 2010) (Note: US Patent 20110053131 A1 Patrice M. Regnier, W. Daniel Hillis (inventors) "Systems and Methods for Choreographing Movement" Filed August 26, 2010, Application N° 12/869565 Published (issued) March 3, 2011) (Note: US Patent 9275617 B2 Patrice Mary Regnier (inventor) "Systems and Methods For Choreographing Movement Using Location Indicators" Filed March 26, 2015, Application N° 14/669209 Published (issued) Vol. 1424, N° 1, March 1, 2016) (Note: US Patent 20060245599 A1 Patrice Regnier (inventor) "Systems and Methods for Choreographing Movement" Filed April 27, 2005, Application N° 11/116049 Published (issued) November 2, 2006) (Note: US Trademark: "TERP" Patrice Regnier (owner) "TERP" (Standard Charter Mark) Serial N° 85527528, Registration N° 4978245, Registered June 14, 2016) technology to facilitate choreographed movement without rehearsal.

== Overview ==
Patrice Regnier, a Minneapolis, MN native, is a graduate of Interlochen Arts Academy and the Juilliard School, where she danced with artists including Anna Sokolow and José Limón. In 1974, Regnier founded Rush Dance, a modern dance performance company based in New York City.

Regnier lived in France between 1994 and 1997, while she cared for life partner and scientist Michel Gouilloud (né Michel Marie Gouilloud; 1930–1997), (Note: Patents of Michel Gouilloud Justia Patents Database, Justia Inc. (a Nevada corporation headquartered in Mountain View, California) OCLC 234195967 (retrieved November 8, 2013)) then suffering from the late stages of Lou Gehrig's disease. Aware of the inevitable progression of his disease, the couple filmed the final years of Gouilloud's life; following his death in 1997 the documentary centered around this footage, Moving Gracefully Towards the Exit, was completed (May 2011).

== Dance ==
Founded in 1974 as a vessel for Regnier's choreography, Rush Dance presented regular seasons in New York at their home space series, "At Home on Broadway", as well as touring domestically and internationally for over 20 years. Domestic venues included New York's Exchange Theatre, The Roundabout Theater the American Theatre Laboratory, Pace University, Lincon Center Out of Doors, Marymount Manhattan Theater, New York City Center, and The Joyce Theater. Additionally, Rush DAnce produced and performed in the 1983 Burlington Noontime Festival. Other domestic performances include the Changing Scene Theater in Denver, CO, the Joy of Movement Center in Boston, both MoMing and the Chicago Dance Center in Chicago, IL, the Walnut Hill Y in Cincinnati, OH and Dance Place in Washington, D.C.

International performances included the Sophia-Antipolis Festival, Paris' Théâtre du Rond-Point, the Opera House in Cologne and Academie de Kuntz the in Berlin.

Premiered in 1984, the ballet "R.A.B.," synthesizes Regnier's work with bodies, movement and technology. "R.A.B," the first dance performance to integrate 3-D human movement computer animation with live performance; went on to tour most notably to Chicago’s Arie Crown Theater for SIGGRAPH. In 1985 the ballet was made into a film, shot by Edward Lachman and retitled R.A.B.L, and broadcast domestically on Bravo and Showtime in the United States.

Regnier was awarded a double prize at the International Choreography Competition in Berlin in 1975. She has taught and presented at the St. Thomas School of Dance, Pace University, Drew University, University of Colorado, University of California, and Colorado College.

== Film ==
Moving Gracefully Towards the Exit, a documentary film written and directed by Regnier and Jean-Bernard Andro, was an Official Selection at the Santa Cruz Film Festival and was the winner of the Best European Independent Documentary at the European Independent Film Festival. American composer Carter Burwell (Fargo, Twilight, Being John Malkovich) created the score for the documentary.

== Technology ==
Regnier has helped to found many interdisciplinary organizations, including ARTeam, an association of art and technology experts and Human Development Productions, which produces film and video.

Regnier acts as a creative consultant for several companies, including Interval Research Corporation, founded by Paul Allen, the co-founder of Microsoft. She has spoken on panels including the F.A.U.S.T. art and technology conference in Toulouse, France, and the 2013 Envision Symposium in Monterey, California.

Regnier is currently developing the TERP system, a patented wireless multi-channel broadcast system of custom built hardware and software for composing, directing and driving human movement without rehearsal. Public TERP events are held semi-regularly in New York City.

== Collaborators ==
- Composer Liz Swados
- Tom Brigham (Morphing inventor)
- Carter Burwell, composer
- Sallie Wilson, American Ballet Theatre
- Steve Bray, composer
- Raymond LeGué, founder: Electrogig
- Bran Ferren, Applied Minds
- Laurie Anderson and Joy Mountford.
