= Martin Gutteridge =

British special effects artist (born 1939)

- Born: April 1939 (age 86); London, England
- Occupation(s): Special effects artist, miniature maker

Martin Gutteridge (born April 1939) is a British special effects artist and miniature maker. He was nominated for an Academy Award in the category Best Visual Effects for the film Little Shop of Horrors.

In addition to his Academy Award nomination, he won a Primetime Emmy Award and was nominated for two more in the category Outstanding Special Visual Effects for his work on the television programs War and Remembrance and Hornblower and also the television film Ironclads. In 1971, he founded Effects Associates.

== Selected filmography ==
- Little Shop of Horrors (1985; co-nominated with Lyle Conway and Bran Ferren)
