= American Community School =

American Community School may refer to:

- American Community School at Beirut
- American Community School in Amman, a private, preparatory, international school in Amman
- ACS International Schools, a group of four private schools, three in England and one in Qatar

== See also ==
- ACS (disambiguation)
