= Lyle Conway =

American film puppeteer and designer (died 2026)

- Born: Chicago, Illinois, U.S.
- Died: March 4, 2026
- Occupations: Puppeteer, actor, producer, designer, fabrication supervisor
- Employer(s): Jim Henson's Creature Shop, Disney, Rob Bottin

Lyle Conway (died c. 2026) was an American actor, puppeteer and designer, best known for his work with Jim Henson on The Dark Crystal (1982) and his work on Little Shop of Horrors through the creation of the Audrey II puppet.

== Early life ==
Lyle Conway was raised in Chicago's Southwest side. He gained interest in the world of fantasy creatures as a child through the TV show Kukla, Fran, and Ollie, and the film King Kong. Conway created his first puppets as a child using household materials to replicate these characters. When Conway was older he attended art school where he won several awards from the Art Institute of Chicago before moving on to Hollywood.

== Career ==
Conway worked as a social worker for four years and then went on to design for a leading toy company. He then began his work in Hollywood with Gene Warren and David Allen. Conway worked under Jim Henson in the Creature Shop where he began his work sculpting Miss Piggy for the fifth season of The Muppet Show and The Great Muppet Caper.

On The Muppet Show Conway worked mainly as a Muppet designer. He worked as a sculptor for characters like Miss Piggy and the Dodo. He also was the creator behind Lyle the Dog, and the character was named after him.

This allowed him to work on the film The Dark Crystal. On Dark Crystal, Conway was the design and fabrication supervisor of creature development. He worked specifically on Skeksis, Urskeks, and Aughra where he developed cable and radio control mechanisms through the creation of their animatronic characters. Conway built and designed the Aughra puppet used in the film. Conway also provided the voice of the Urskeks.

He led the design team on Disney and Walter Murch's film Return to Oz. There he created characters including Jack Pumpkinhead, Billina, and Gump. Conway not only created Gump but voiced the character as well. The character Jack Pumpkinhead was voiced by Brian Henson through Conway's casting.

Conway returned to the Jim Henson Creature Shop to work on the film Dreamchild where he oversaw the shop for the film. Through his experience, he and his team were able to efficiently create several creatures with a minimal budget. Conway described it as, "one-fourth the work of The Dark Crystal at ten times the speed", where they created six creatures in fourteen weeks.

He worked on the film Link where he was a creature effects supervisor as well as a consultant on the film.

Conway created the animatronics used in the TV movie Red Crow and the Ghost Ship. One of the animatronics that Conway worked on was the Red Crow.

He worked on the television film The Murders in the Rue Morgue as a puppet designer and creator. Here he created the ape used in the film.

Conway worked under Frank Oz on Little Shop of Horrors where they created and designed the Audrey II puppet. When Conway was designing the puppet he looked towards flower shops and botanical gardens to look for inspiration. Conway wanted Audrey II to be a cross between a cactus and Ukrainian eggs. He wanted to make Audrey II into something precious that Seymour would take home with him. In the designing process, Conway and Frank Oz had conflicting ideas on what Audrey II should look like. Oz wanted to make Audrey II look soft and Conway wanted to make it look horrific so they had to compromise and ended up creating the Audrey II used in the film. Conway began creating Audrey II through the creation of working prototypes that they named the "Feed Me" Plant. This prototype was created for three months before being rebuilt. Conway used cables, radio controls, and hydraulic pumps to achieve the movement seen in the film and foam rubber and cables to create the puppet. Both Conway and Oz recorded the footage of Audrey II's movement so it could be reviewed. Through this revision, Conway sped through the footage and realized that Audrey II's movement looked better sped up. Because of this Conway pitched the idea of having the actors act in slow motion and to speed it up in the final cut to make the puppet more fluid. The actors agreed to this and the scenes where the actors are in the same frame as Audrey II were performed in slow motion. Through his work on the Audrey II puppet, Conway was nominated for three awards, an Academy Award in the category Best Visual Effects (co-nominated with Bran Ferren and Martin Gutteridge), a Saturn Award, and a BAFTA film award, for the special effects used.

He worked on The Blob where he focused on the special effects and was one of the designers. Conway was originally in charge of the film's effects but after personnel changes, Tony Gardner took over.

Conway was the associate producer on the film Trinity and Beyond: The Atomic Bomb Movie.

On the 1998 film Deep Rising, Conway was hired by Rob Bottin's studio. He worked as a painter on the film's crew.

In the 1998 film Blade, Conway makes an appearance as the character Reichardt.

He worked for Jim Henson's creature shop on the 2009 film Where the Wild Things Are. For this film, he sculpted the models of the monsters.

== Death ==
On March 4, 2026, it was announced that Conway had died. At the 98th Academy Awards, his name was mentioned in the In Memoriam section.

== Filmography ==
=== Film ===
Year	Film	Designer	Producer	Puppeteer	Actor	Role	Notes
1979	The Day Time Ended	Yes	No	No	No		Stop-motion Figures Designer and Creator
1981	The Great Muppet Caper	Yes	No	No	No		Muppet Builder & Designer
1982	The Dark Crystal	Yes	No	No	Yes	Urskes	Creature Design and Fabrication Supervisor
1985	Return to Oz	Yes	No	Yes	Yes	The Gump (voice)	Muppet Builder & designer
1985	Dreamchild	Yes	No	Yes	No		Creature Effects Supervisor
1986	Link	Yes	No	No	No		Creature Effects Supervisor, Consultant
1986	Little Shop of Horrors	Yes	No	No	No		Designer and Creator of "Audrey II"
1988	The Blob	Yes	No	No	No		"Blob" Creature Effects Designer and Creator
1995	Trinity and Beyond: The Atomic Bomb Movie	No	Yes	No	No		Associate Producer
1998	Deep Rising	Yes	No	No	No		Painter
1998	Blade	No	No	No	Yes	Reichardt	Actor
2009	Where the Wild Things Are	Yes	No	No	No		Sculptor

=== Television ===
Year	Film	Designer	Puppeteer	Notes
1980	The Muppet Show	Yes	No	Muppet Designer
1986	Red Crow and the Ghost Ship	Yes	Yes	Worked on Animatronics
1986	The Murders in the Rue Morgue	Yes	No	Puppet Designer and Creator

== Awards and nominations ==
Year	Award	Category	Nominated work	Result
1987	Academy Award	Best Effects, Visual Effects	Little Shop of Horrors	Nominated
1987	Saturn Award	Best Special Effects	Little Shop of Horrors	Nominated
1988	BAFTA Film Award	Best Special Effects	Little Shop of Horrors	Nominated
