= Conversations with Michael Eisner =

American TV talk show

- Created by: Michael Eisner
- Starring: Michael Eisner; Candice Bergen; Bran Ferren; Goldie Hawn; Bette Midler; Dana White; Jeffrey Immelt
- Country of origin: United States
- Original language: English

Production
- Producers: Kevin Kane; James Deutch; Michael Eisner; Steve Friedman
- Running time: 60 minutes

Original release
- Network: CNBC
- Release: March 28, 2006 – April 6, 2009

Conversations with Michael Eisner was a one-hour talk show that ran monthly from March 2006 to April 2009 on CNBC.

The show was hosted by former Walt Disney Company chairman and CEO Michael Eisner, who interviewed industry leaders and entertainers. The guests for the first show were businesswoman and television personality Martha Stewart, creative designer and technologist Bran Ferren, and British-American businessman and studio head Howard Stringer.

In December 2008, the show's cancellation was announced, with the final show airing in April 2009.
