= Bran Ferren =

American technologist

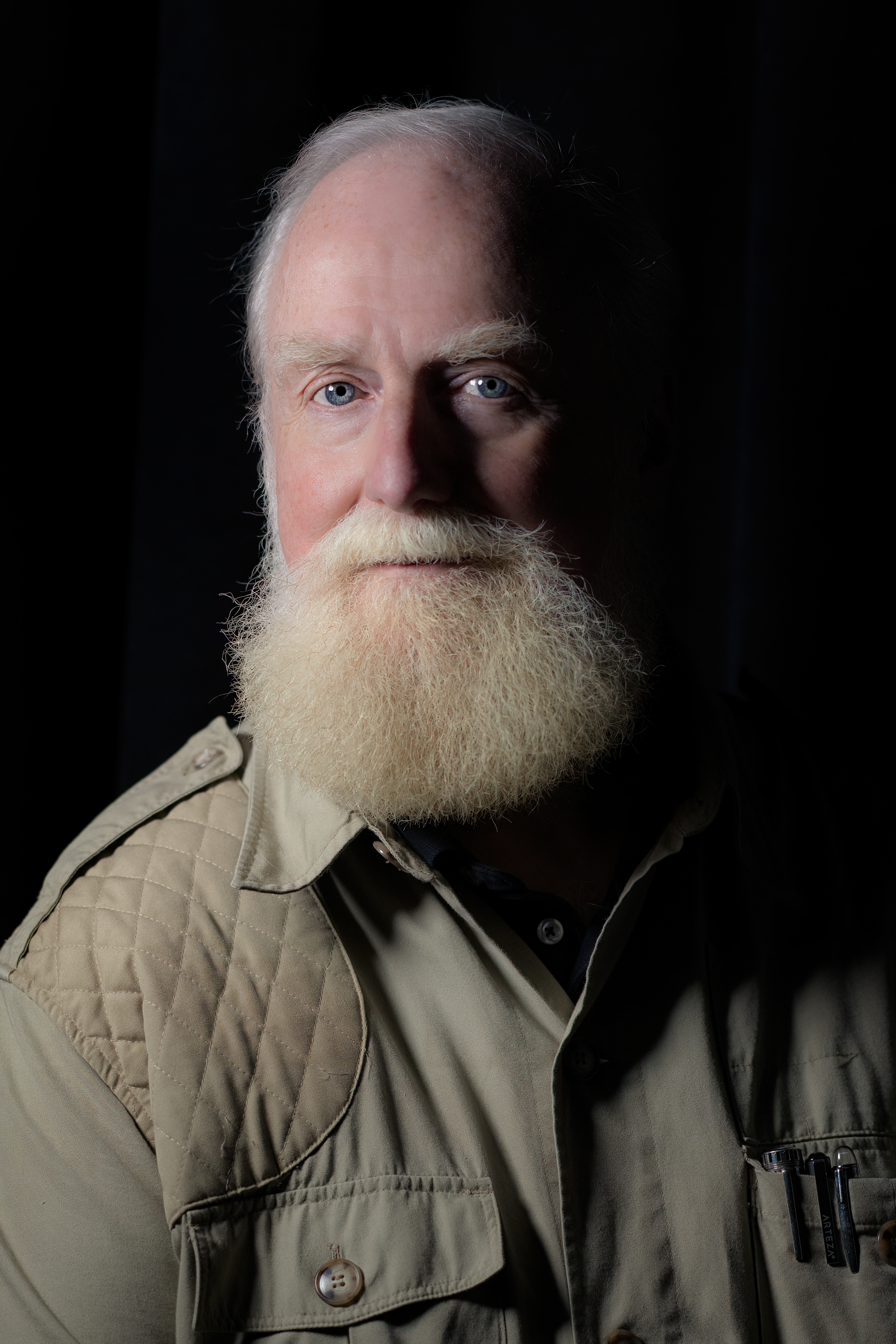
- Ferren at Applied Minds in 2022
- Born: January 16, 1953 (age 73); New York City, NY, U.S.
- Education: Massachusetts Institute of Technology
- Occupations: Co-founder and chief creative officer, Applied Minds
- Father: John Ferren

Bran Ferren (born January 16, 1953) is an American artist, vehicle designer, visual effects artist, photographer, and inventor. Ferren was President of Research and Development of Walt Disney Imagineering as well as founder of Associates & Ferren, a multidisciplinary engineering and design firm acquired in 1993 by Disney. He is Chief Creative Officer of Applied Minds, which he co-founded in 2000 with Danny Hillis. Apple's "pinch-to-zoom" patent, which features in its legal battle with Samsung, was invalidated by the US Patent and Trademark Office in 2013 based on a 2005 patent by Ferren and Hillis for multi-touch gestures. He holds US Patent #8381985 (assigned to Intel Corporation), which teaches the use of two or more cameras and electronic image processing to emulate optical zoom, technology used in many multi-lens smartphones.

== Early life ==
Bran Ferren is the only child of artists John Ferren and Rae Tonkel Ferren. His father's work is in many American art museums and was a member of the New York School of Abstract Expressionists. His father was friends with Alfred Hitchcock and created paintings for The Trouble with Harry and designed the nightmare sequence in Vertigo.

Ferren attended Hunter College Elementary School in New York City, followed by a year at the American Community School Beirut while his father was artist-in-residence for a Department of State cultural exchange program. He spent three years at the McBurney School in New York City, and then the last three years of high school at East Hampton High School, in East Hampton, New York.

Ferren started his first design and engineering company, Synchronetics while in high school. He left high school at age 16 to attend MIT, but departed in 1970 to continue entrepreneurial pursuits. He was invited back to be a keynote speaker for MIT Technology Day 1996. Ferren worked on TV commercials, films, and regional theater and pioneered visual effects for arena concerts.

== Career ==
=== Early career ===
During the 1960s and 1970s, while first still enrolled as a student, Ferren was hired as the Technical Director for the John Drew Theater, at Guild Hall. He staged shows, designed lighting and sound for productions, and designed upgrades.

=== Associates & Ferren ===
Ferren founded Associates & Ferren at the age of 25 to do work at the "crossroads of design and science and entertainment." One of the first projects was for Broadway play The Crucifer of Blood. The production featured a "shattering display of thunder and lightning", which got the attention of director Ken Russell, leading to Ferren's first assignment as special visual effects director on the film, Altered States.

Ferren has designed the special effects and sound for several Broadway shows, and is a member of the Broadway stagehands union. Frank Rich said in his The New York Times review of Sunday in the Park with George: "What Mr. Lapine, his designers and the special-effects wizard Bran Ferren have arranged is simply gorgeous." It was the first Broadway musical to utilize digitally-processed projection mapping, a radio-controlled costume with a robotic endoskeleton, 20 kW xenon rotating-dichroic-filter light ray effects, and high powered lasers that broke the 4th wall, traveling throughout the audience. Carol Lawson said in The New York Times that "critics have remarked that Mr. Ferren's work on this play, which included the spectacular destruction of Dr. Frankenstein's laboratory by his monster, had the lavishness that audiences have come to expect in films, but have never before seen in the theater."

As principal designer of Associates & Ferren, Ferren led special effects for the Paul McCartney World Tour, Pink Floyd, and visual effects for Little Shop of Horrors. He designed the titles for Guilty as Sin, and Little Shop of Horrors. In addition to special effects, they were considered leaders in advanced projection, simulation and laser effects technology, and provided customized equipment for road tours, and stationary installations.

Ferren produced, directed, and was the cinematographer for the movie Funny released in 1992, which received a Nomination for a Grand Jury Prize at the Sundance Film Festival, and nomination for Best Documentary at the Chicago International Film Festival, Gold Jury prize at the Houston International Film Festival (now called WorldFest Houston), and was featured at the Cleveland International Film Festival. "Funny" features over 100 individuals, from Dick Cavett to Frank Zappa, telling their favorite jokes on camera.

Ferren served as lead designer, engineer, and producer of the 50-state, 16-month tour of the Bill of Rights, which celebrated the document's bicentennial. He designed and built the Bill of Rights Secure Transit Vehicle, which transported the fragile parchment document, as well as a 15,000-square-foot traveling exhibit equipped with state-of-the-art lighting, A/V, security, and safety systems. He was the chief designer for the Columbus Center Hall of Exploration, a science discovery center, located at Baltimore's Inner Harbor in 1997.

Associates & Ferren developed technologies in the areas of robotics, sound systems, vehicle systems, control systems, scientific research & experiment design, optical systems, and 3D machine vision, as well as moving lighting fixtures for Strand Lighting Inc. Ferren was responsible for the development of advanced lens and thin-film dichroic coating technologies for the Revo Sunglasses brand, and served in the role of Director of Research & Development for Revo. He invented the what is believed to be the first multi-monitor video wall, which premiered at the opening of the Palladium Club, also in New York City, in 1985.

In a New York Times profile on Ferren by Stephen Farber, when Paul Mazursky's film Tempest (1982) was released, Farber quotes Mazursky as saying Ferren is "a Renaissance man, a figure from another time ... If you crossed Robert Oppenheimer and Monty Woolley, you might get Bran."

By the time Disney acquired Associates & Ferren in 1993, Ferren and the company had won an Academy Award for Science and Engineering as well as two Academy Awards for Technical Achievement. Ferren was also nominated for an Oscar for Best Visual Effects for "Little Shop of Horrors", and received a British Academy of Film and Television Arts (BAFTA) nomination for special visual effects. He is a member of both the Academy of Motion Picture Arts and Sciences, and the Television Academy of Arts and Sciences.

His entertainment industry projects at Associates & Ferren include:

Film visual effects, lighting, design

- Altered States
- Star Trek V: The Final Frontier
- Little Shop of Horrors
- Dirty Rotten Scoundrels
- Making Mr. Right
- The Manhattan Project (also actor)
- Tempest
- Deathtrap
- Places in the Heart
- Second Sight
- The Untouchables

Film direction

- Funny: A Bran Ferren Film
- The Light Fantastic – Corning Museum of Glass

Network television

- ABC News Primetime LIVE!
- ABC News: Day One
- CBS News - design consultant
- NBC News - technology consultant

Concert visual effects

- Pink Floyd
- Roger Waters
- Paul McCartney
- R.E.M.
- Rush
- Depeche Mode
- David Bowie
- Jefferson Starship
- Foreigner

Broadway visual effects, projection, sound design

- Evita
- Macbeth
- Rock 'N Roll The First 5,000 Years
- Cats
- Sunday in the Park with George
- Woman of the Year
- ELVIS! An American Musical
- Spookhouse
- The Crucifer of Blood
- Frankenstein

=== The Walt Disney Company ===
Ferren led the Disney Imagineering R&D group as senior vice president, then executive vice president, eventually becoming president of R&D and Creative Technology for Disney, and head of technology for the company for 10 years. According to his former boss, CEO Michael Eisner, Ferren's mission was "to dream about the future and show us new and innovative ways to tell stories". Starting in 1993, he was the first corporate executive to receive the job title of "Creative Technology". When Eisner interviewed him on his talk show, Conversations with Michael Eisner, he said that he loved that Bran "pushed me against the wall, and pushed management" in the areas of creativity and technology.

Ferren supported Disney's Strategic Planning Group and had creative and technical involvement in design and technology projects for Disney Theme Parks, such as the Tower of Terror ride, the Test Track by General Motors, the Indiana Jones Adventure, the Virtual Reality Animation Studio, and prime time television projects. He has collaborated with ABC network director Roger Goodman on news, sports, and entertainment division projects. His team was responsible for engineering the ABC Times Square Studios armored electronic-dimming soundproof window systems, robotic cameras, large on-air displays, and a massive curved LED ticker display.

In 1996, Ferren created the Disney Fellows Program which attracted computer science people including Alan Kay, Marvin Minsky, and Seymour Papert, as well as astronaut Story Musgrave. The first Disney fellow was parallel-computing pioneer Hillis with whom Ferren founded technology firm Applied Minds in 2000. In 1997, Ferren and the Disney fellows were profiled in The New Yorker by David Remnick, and in many other publications and news service including Bloomberg, and Newsweek.

While at Disney, Ferren developed a test for screening design & engineering talent. Known as the Yellow Box Test, it asks the candidate to go through 100 or so items in a box, all selected for their uniqueness and interest. As featured in a 2003 article in Discover magazine, they are scored on not just how well they can correctly identify the items, but also their thoughtfulness in explaining how they would be used and why, material selection, sourcing, cost, viable alternatives, and the technical and design principles, and even aesthetics.

=== Applied Minds ===
Ferren's company Applied Minds L.L.C. (AMI) has been described as a "Willy Wonka and the Chocolate Factory" for geeks. AMI invents, designs, prototypes, and creates high-technology products, vehicles, architectural designs, and services. The Smithsonian American Art Museum selected Applied Minds as winner of an international design competition for the renovation of the Renwick Gallery's Grand Salon. AMI has spun off technology companies Metaweb, purchased by Google in 2010 and cancer diagnostics firm Advanced Proteomics.

In his role as chief creative officer and co-chairman, Ferren has headed projects for General Motors, Northrop Grumman, Lockheed Martin, John Deere, Herman Miller, Intel Corporation, Sony Corporation, ESRI, the Smithsonian Institution, Genworth Financial, and several US Government agencies. He was the creative design lead at Applied Minds, for the Genworth R70i Aging Experience, featuring a novel computerized robotic exoskeleton to simulate aging with live audiences at venues such as the 2016 CES and then the Liberty Science Center, as well as Genworth Financial's new website. The R70i Aging Experience at CES received the 2016 Cool Tech award.

Ferren has been named inventor on over 500 current and pending US patents. His 2005 patent with Hillis for multi-touch gestures led to the invalidation of Apple's "pinch-to-zoom" patent, which Apple cited in its billion-dollar lawsuit against Samsung. His 2009 US patent #8381985 (assigned to Intel Corporation) teaches the use of two cameras and electronic image processing to emulate the function of zoom lenses within devices such as smart phones, where traditional zoom lenses cannot fit.

Ferren has also been lead designer and engineer on Research & Development vehicle projects, including The KiraVan, the next-generation of the MaxiMog, also based on a Mercedes Unimog chassis. He has given talks on the creative design, engineering, and technology aspects of large-scale Expedition Vehicles at several EG Conference (2013), and at ArtCenter College of Design in Pasadena. The MaxiMog, designed to support scientific explorations, research, and location photography. In 2001, the MaxiMog was on exhibit for three months at the Museum of Modern Art in New York City. The SmarTruck II, an Army concept vehicle (TARDEC) for defense and emergency response, featured at the 2003 Detroit Auto show.

Ferren's architectural and interior design projects include the UCLA's Connection Lab, and Lockheed Martin's Center for Innovation, known as "The Lighthouse". Under Ferren's direction, Applied Minds expanded into the defense and corporate technology sectors. He has been lead designer for over 100 command centers for the United States Government and private corporations. His approach adapts immersive Dara-rich experiential architecture, to high-intensity military decision-making spaces.

=== Public speaking and writing ===
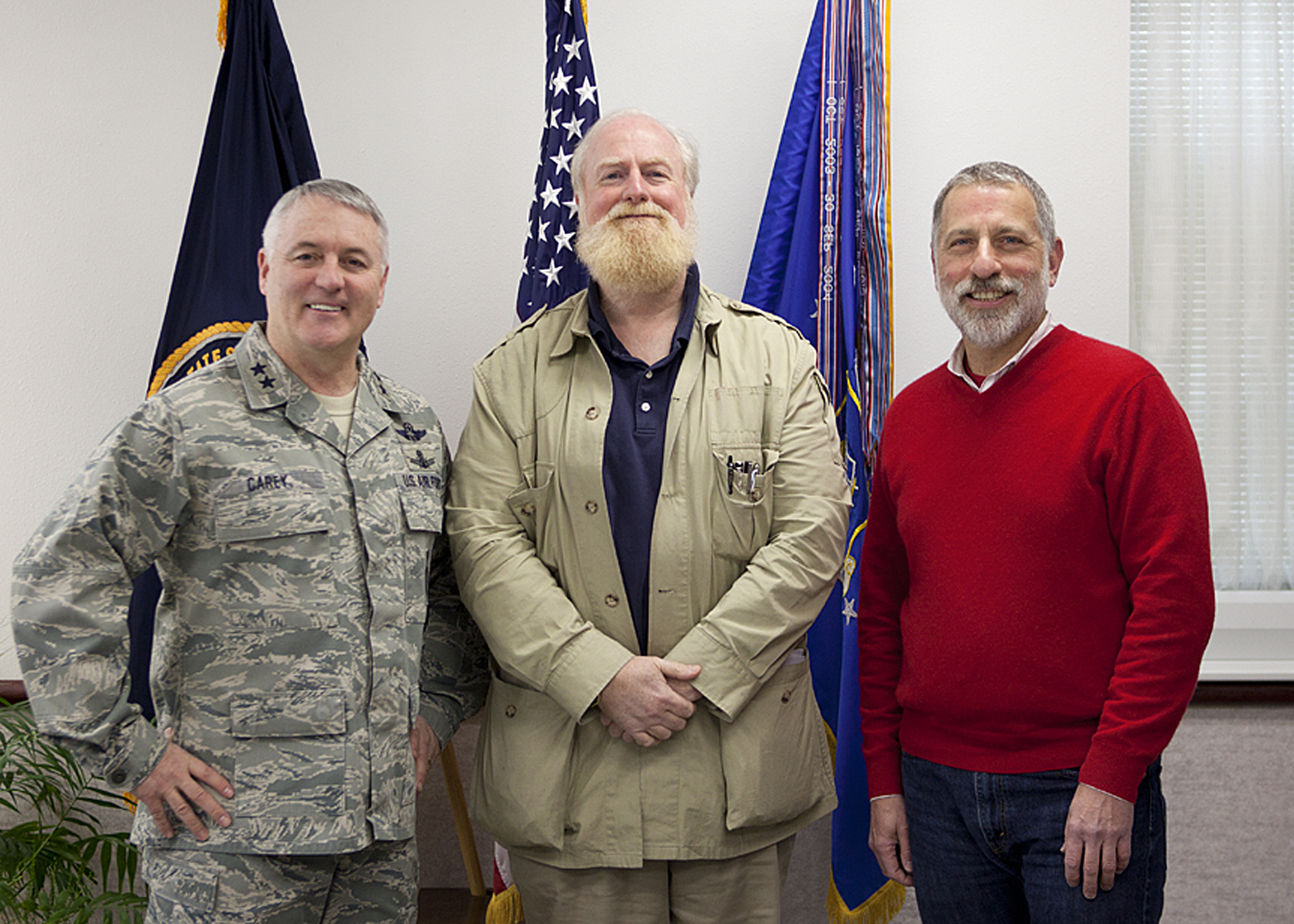
Ferren, along with Eric Angelson and United States Air Force Major General Michael Carey in 2013

Ferren has delivered the commencement speeches to the California State University, Northridge - College of Arts, Media and Communication (2002) The University of Redlands- College of Arts and Sciences (2014), and the University of Irvine - Claire Trevor School of the Arts, the School of Education, and the School of Physical Sciences (2015). He was one of the first lecturers and writers to discuss controversial internet-related topics such as the concept of networked human implants, and the idea that reading & writing could turn out to be a fad, to be replaced within 250 years by better and more compelling technology.

Ferren was one of the first technical experts to articulate the concept of emotional resolution for imaging systems, in particular for cinema production. As an early advocate for self-driving cars, his 2014 TED talk: "To Create for the Ages, Let's Combine Art & Engineering", has been called a must-see talk for engineers, discusses the intersection between art, design, and engineering; and why technologies such as autonomous vehicles will permanently change our world; has been viewed over a million times.

Ferren has been invited to speak at US Government sponsored conferences, advancing his ideas on leadership & innovation, technology, acquisition reform, as well advancing controversial ideas such as suggesting that the US armed forces should get off as GPS/GNSS as their primary source of precision Position, Navigation and Timing (PNT) within a decade.

Ferren has consulted for, and been interviewed on The Dick Cavett Show, ABC Nightline with Ted Koppel, The Tomorrow Society, CuriosityStream, Conversations with Michael Eisner, Dreamland and The Age of A.I. (2019-2020) Hosted by Robert Downey Jr.

Ferren has authored articles for The New York Times Magazine, MIT Technology Review, The Journal of the Acoustical Society of America, Talking Back to the Machine (Peter J. Denning, editor), The Journal of Museum Education, the Proceedings of SPIE, and Quartz. He has been a proponent of Geodesign, an emerging field that integrates geographic analysis with design processes, advocating its application to urban, regional, and global planning.

In May 2026, Ferren was named and honored on the "Forbes 250 America's Greatest Living Innovators" list. He spoke at the America 250 Forbes America Innovates stage, regarding artificial intelligence.

=== Advisory board memberships and related activities ===
Ferren's advisory work has included board memberships at the U.S. Federal Communications Commission, Securities and Exchange Commission, International Design Conference in Aspen, PBS Kids and the science magazine Nautilus. He has also served as a member of the Army Science Board for five years, the Defense Science Board, the Naval Historical Foundation Advisory Council, The USO Digital Advisory Council, The Department of Homeland Security, and the Chief of Naval Operations Executive Panel. Bran Ferren is a member of the advisory boards for the Jacobs Institute for Design Innovation at UC Berkeley, CuriosityStream, NanoMech, ReactiveCore. In 2016, he was appointed to Toyota Research Institute (TRI) senior advisory board for driving autonomy, artificial intelligence, and robotics. He is a member of the board of directors for NPR's The Loh Down on Science.

While serving as head of Creative Technology for Disney, and also a member the Army Science Board (ASB), Ferren played a key roll in the creation of what became USC's Institute for Creative Technologies. As a science & technology advisor to Four-star Army General Paul J. Kern in Modeling & Simulation (M&S) he recommended creating a new entity in the vicinity of Los Angeles that would be anchored at a major university. The purpose of this organization being to draw from the local talent pool, and its deep expertise in gaming, visualization, and UI/UX design. When asked why it should be there, rather than say the DC area, he stated emphatically that to be successful in this new domain, the army "needed to be where the action is." Under Gen. Kern's leadership, and with the help of Army funding, the ICT was established in 1999 at the University of Southern California (USC), and has become an important and sustaining resource for the Department of Defense in gaming, modeling, & simulation technologies.

=== Fine art photography ===
Two of his photographs have been accepted into the Smithsonian Museum for American Art permanent collection. He has presented and exhibited his artwork at 2008 the Entertainment Gathering (e.g.) Conference, and exhibited his photography and multimedia work at the Guild Hall Museum, East Hampton. His photographs are part of several private collections, and he is completing the editorial work for a large format photo book project called Eleven Seconds.

=== Creative collaborations ===
In 2009, Ferren collaborated with Laurie Anderson on the exhibition "The Third Mind" at the Guggenheim Museum in New York. In 2004, he helped to develop a gigapixel image system and 360-degree cyclorama with artist/photographer Clifford Ross. He worked with Patrice Regnier and Carter Burwell on his film project TESLA. He had creative meetings with Jim Henson in 1988 about a Muppets theme park prior to Henson selling his company to Disney. Prior to the Disney acquisition, Ferren had been in discussions with Steve Ross, CEO of Warner Communications about his acquiring Associates & Ferren and collaborating with Alan Kay on advanced entertainment and gaming technology. He is cited as a senior inventor at the company Intellectual Ventures, headed by former Microsoft CTO, Nathan Myhrvold. Myhrvold and Ferren are often cited as being close or best friends and collaborators.

=== Awards and commendations ===
- 1980, Los Angeles Drama Critics Circle award for Special Visual & Sound Effects, The Crucifer of Blood
- 1980, Ahmanson Theater Award for Distinguished Special Visual & Sound Effects
- 1982, Academy Technical Achievement Award for the first computerized lightning effects system
- 1984, New York Drama Desk Awards for Outstanding Special Effects, Sunday in the Park with George
- 1984, Joseph Maharam Foundation Award
- 1984, American Theater Wing Hewes Design Award
- 1986, Academy Award nomination for Visual Effects, Little Shop of Horrors (co-nominated with Lyle Conway and Martin Gutteridge)
- 1998, British Academy of Film and Television Arts (BAFTA) nomination for special visual effects
- 1998, Wally Russell Lifetime Achievement Award in Lighting Design
- 2000, Kilby International Award for significant contributions to society
- 2011, Fast Company's list of "100 Most Creative People in Business"
- 2014, US Intelligence Community Seal Medallion
- 2016, Sir Arthur Clarke Lifetime Achievement Award for Imagination in Service to Society
- 2022, inducted into the Guild Hall Academy of the Arts
- 2026, Forbes 250: America’s Greatest Innovators list (#201)
- 2026, Universe Multicultural Film Festival Lifetime Achievement Award

== In popular culture ==
The final scene in the 1980s music video "Take On Me" by A-ha was inspired by the similar scene designed by Ferren in Altered States.

A popular 1980s MTV Television bumper featured a take-off of the final transformation scene in Altered States, designed and art directed by Ferren.
