= Mean Green Mother from Outer Space =

Song from the 1986 film Little Shop of Horrors

Song by Levi Stubbs and the Little Shop of Horrors Chorus

from the album Little Shop of Horrors (Original Motion Picture Soundtrack)
- Released: 1986
- Genre: Soul; R&B
- Length: 4:48 (soundtrack album) 4:30 (in film) 4:03 (radio edit)
- Label: Geffen Records
- Composer(s): Alan Menken
- Lyricist(s): Howard Ashman

"Mean Green Mother from Outer Space" (Note: On the soundtrack album, the song's title is written as "Mean Green Mother from Outerspace".) is a song from the 1986 American horror comedy musical film Little Shop of Horrors, an adaptation of the 1982 stage musical, which is itself an adaptation of the 1960 film The Little Shop of Horrors. Written by the musical's creators, lyricist and book writer Howard Ashman and composer Alan Menken, the song is performed in the film by Audrey II (voiced by singer Levi Stubbs of the Four Tops), a sentient, carnivorous, alien plant that feeds on human blood.

Ashman and Menken wrote "Mean Green Mother from Outer Space" specifically for the 1986 film, as a new musical number not present in the stage production. The song was nominated for an Academy Award for Best Original Song at the 59th Academy Awards. It is the first Oscar-nominated song to contain profanity in the lyrics. Stubbs performed the song at the awards ceremony, with the explicit lyrics replaced.

== Overview ==
Little Shop of Horrors follows Seymour (Rick Moranis), a floral shop employee who discovers, nurtures, and commercially exploits a sentient carnivorous plant that feeds on human blood, naming it "Audrey II" after his co-worker and love interest Audrey (Ellen Greene). As the film progresses, Audrey II grows larger and more demanding, and gains the ability to speak. "Mean Green Mother from Outer Space" is the 14th musical number, near the end of the film, and is sung by Audrey II, after Seymour discovers that the plant intends to take over the world. The song's lyrics reveal that Audrey II originated from outer space, and emphasize "Seymour's culpability in its creation and path of destruction".

A revival of the stage musical at London's Regent's Park Open Air Theatre in 2018 interpolated the song as an encore number sung by American drag performer Vicky Vox, who played Audrey II in the production.

== Production ==
In Howard Ashman's initial concept for the film adaptation of the musical, a planned "rap song" was included as a "big number" for Audrey II.

In addition to three other songs written for the film (two of which were for the end credits), "Bad" was the first attempt at Audrey II's final number. "Bad" was written into the film's screenplay and the sequence was storyboarded by Mike Ploog. The song never made it past the demo stage. When Frank Oz signed on to direct he requested a possible change to "Bad". Ashman and Menken returned with a reworked version titled "Bad Like Me", and later settled on a third and final attempt, which was "Mean Green Mother from Outer Space".

The film version of the song includes an extended intro and instrumental break, alternate orchestrations, two cut verses, and two alternate lines.

== Themes and interpretations ==
Film historian Ed Guerrero, making note of the "resonant, distinctly black voice" of Stubbs, wrote that Audrey II's rapid growth and "singing 'I'm a mean, green mother from outer space and I'm bad!' plays on white suburbanite and neoconservative anxieties that expanding non-white immigrant populations will become as large, demanding, and assertive as indigenous blacks are already perceived to be."

Author Jane Caputi, wrote that the song's lyrics "denounce those humans who have shown a poor grasp of etiquette, who remain totally oblivious to the forces that they have been 'messin' with,' and who must now face the consequences. [... Stubbs] brings markedly Black speech to the role, criticized by some as minstrel-like, although Stubbs refutes this. The Black speech tones ensure, though, that the 'mean green mother' is understood as a mutha-fucka' in that sense of the indomitable and inexorable force, the "Mutha'" who here encompasses Nature-Earth and Universe."

== Awards and nominations ==
| Award | Category | Recipient(s) | Result | Ref. |
|---|---|---|---|---|
| Academy Awards | Best Original Song | Alan Menken and Howard Ashman | Nominated | |
