= Calvary Christian School (Covington, Kentucky) =

Private Christian school in Kentucky, US

Location
- Covington, Kentucky; 38.9767°N 84.5052°W

Information
- Type: Private Christian
- Motto: Equipping the Next Generation to Impact the World for Christ
- Established: 1974
- Administrator: Dr. Bill Dickens
- Enrollment: 555
- Colors: Red; Gold
- Mascot: Cougars
- Website: www.ccsky.org

Calvary Christian School is a private Christian school located in Covington, Kentucky. CCS is a ministry of Calvary Baptist Church located in Latonia, Kentucky. It has approximately 400 students from Preschool to 12th grade.

== History ==
Calvary was founded in November 1973 under the leadership of Galen Call. Sixty-three students in grades 1–4 began the school year, soon to be joined by 35 kindergarten students one week later. Soon 65 acres (260,000 m^{2}) were acquired south of Latonia on Taylor Mill Road. Ground-breaking for the new Calvary Christian School location occurred on July 7, 1974, and was completed in 1976.

Calvary Christian School is a ministry of Calvary Baptist Church in Latonia, Kentucky.

== Sports ==
The mascot of Calvary Christian School is the Cougar. Calvary offers many different sports, e.g., volleyball, soccer, basketball, baseball, cheerleading, cross country, golf, tennis, track, swimming, softball, and archery.
