= Atmospherics =

In marketing, the term atmospherics is used to describe the discipline of designing commercial spaces. The study of atmospherics deals with the impact of design and branding on customer experiences and behavior. Brands utilize atmospherics as a form of marketing.

Atmospherics was coined by Philip Kotler in a 1973 article in the Journal of Retailing.

Kotler argues that the tangible product is only a small part of the total consumption package. Buyers respond to the total product, which includes services, warranties, packaging, advertising, financing, pleasantries, images and so on. Atmospherics covers three major art forms important to retail: architecture: exterior structure, interior design, and the design of window displays. The atmosphere of a commercial space performs three functions: creating attention, messages (communication) and affect.

In the context of atmospherics, the design of a space may influence how it is perceived by its users. Kotler uses religious buildings as an example of environments designed to evoke particular emotional responses.

Kotler provides two definitions of atmospherics. It is the "conscious designing of space to create certain effects in buyers" or more precisely, "the effort to design buying environments to produce specific emotional effects in the buyer that enhance purchase probability".

Atmospherics is a qualitative construct that encompasses four of the main senses, with the exclusion of taste. The atmosphere of a commercial space can be divided into the intended atmosphere: the designed space; and the perceived atmosphere: the consumer's perception of that space.

Kotler describes atmospherics as particularly applicable to environments in which products or services are purchased or consumed and where sellers can influence the design of the space. Examples include shops, restaurants, libraries, religious buildings, and civic buildings.

According to Kotler, atmospherics may become more significant when the number of competing outlets increases and differences in products or prices are limited. He also relates atmospherics to the positioning of a value offering and to products and services aimed at specific groups of buyers.

Kotler proposes a causal chain, connecting atmosphere and purchase probability:

- Sensory qualities of space surrounding purchase object
- Buyer's perception of the sensory qualities
- Effect of perceived sensory qualities
- Impact of buyer's modified information and affective state

== See also ==
- Servicescape
