= Community School (Teaneck, New Jersey) =

Coordinates: 40.89432°N 74.00294°W

- Teaneck, NJ; USA

Information
- Type: Private
- Established: 1968
- Principal: Christine Gill
- Colors: Red and White
- Mascot: Eagles

Community School, located in Teaneck, New Jersey, is a private school, founded in 1968 to serve the bright child with learning and attentional disabilities. The school's primary goal is to help children achieve a level of performance in the classroom that is fully commensurate with their respective abilities. The Lower School program provides children in grades K-8 with skilled remedial help and challenging academic experience. The program is designed for children who have learning disabilities (LD), such as ADD/ADHD, dyslexia, dyscalculia, and Apraxia.

Applications are accepted throughout the school year. Enrollment is open to both private students and public school students placed by local school districts. Students who meet any of the descriptions of learning disability, attention deficit disorder, attention deficit-hyperactivity disorder, speech and language and perceptual impairments are eligible.

The school is a member of the New Jersey Association of Independent Schools.

== See also ==
- Community High School - High school for grades 9-12
