= American Community School Beirut =

Location
- 67 Nigeria Street, Jal El-Bahr; Ras Beirut; Beirut; Lebanon; 33.900799°N 35.477242°E

Information
- Other name: ACS Beirut
- Type: Private
- Established: 1905
- Headmaster: Thomas M. Cangiano
- Employees: 250
- Grades: N—12
- Age range: 3-18
- Enrollment: 1130 students
- Language: English, Arabic, French
- Campus: Urban
- Colors: Blue & Gold
- Slogan: Building for the Future: Educating for a Lifetime
- Fight song: K-N-I-G-H-T-S
- Athletics: Basketball, Soccer, Volleyball, Badminton, Track & Field, Swimming, Rugby, Tennis, Golf, Archery
- Accreditation: Middle States Association of Colleges and Schools
- Publication: ACS Matters
- Tuition: ± $17500
- Feeder to: American University of Beirut
- Website: http://www.acs.edu.lb

The American Community School Beirut (Arabic: مدرسة الجالية الأميركية في بيروت), also known as ACS Beirut, is a private school located in Beirut, Lebanon. Founded in 1905, it is traditionally attached to the American University of Beirut. As an independent coeducational institution, it offers education to students of all nationalities, ranging from preschool, students aged from 3 years, to high school grade 12 of the type K-12. It offers the International Baccalaureate and the Lebanese Baccalaureate programs as well as its own college prep program.

== History ==
The school was founded by a small group of American parents from the American University of Beirut, then known as the Syrian Protestant College, who wanted a school where their children could receive preparation for entrance into American universities. The small faculty school thrived and by 1920 had expanded from its original home on rue Bliss to a red-roofed house on rue Sidani. At this point, the American Presbyterian Mission joined the AUB in sponsorship of the school. It was at this point that the school was renamed to the American Community School. By the 1940s, the student body had grown to more than 900 primarily Western children; the present building was built in 1949 with funds provided by ARAMCO. Today, students are primarily Lebanese, as with the university.

The school celebrated its Centennial on June 24, 2005, and in June 2011, ACS Beirut celebrated the graduation of its 100th graduating class. Dr. George H. Damon Jr. remained Headmaster of the school from 2003 till his retirement in 2013.

ACS's history is described by Wade Morris Jr. in A History of ACS; The American Community School at Beirut 1905-2012.

== Academics ==
ACS Beirut offers three types of a high school diploma. The American High School Diploma program prepares students for admission to colleges and universities in the US. All graduates will earn the high school diploma. Additionally, ACS offers the International Baccalaureate diploma as well as the Lebanese Baccalaureate diploma. Each of these three diploma programs has a slightly different course of study, but only in selected grade levels. For the IB Diploma Program, the course of study is differentiated in the last two years of high school. For the Lebanese Baccalaureate, the course of study differs in grades 9 and 12.

== Campus facilities ==
The ACS campus is located within a short distance from the Mediterranean sea. The Lower School building consists of a library, computer center, auditorium, multipurpose hall, art room, as well as the Early Childhood and the Elementary Administrative Wing. The Middle School building houses all Middle School classrooms, science laboratories, lego robotics lab, High School student services, counselors, infirmary, special support personnel, college counselor, and community service advisor, as well as the Upper Library and the Middle School computer center. The building has its own auditorium and music room and houses the School Cafeteria. The Upper School Building, also known as BD Building, consists of a bookstore, Community Lounge, Print Shop, IT Department, High School classrooms, and laboratories, as well as administrative offices.

== Athletics ==
The athletics program partakes in several sporting conferences, including NESAC along with locally held tournaments.

There are awards presented to student-athletes at different levels in Middle School and High School. While all team members are presented with participation patches, four outstanding athletes are presented with four awards respectively. These awards, determined by the coach, are the Fighting Heart Award, the Most Improved Player, Perfect Attendance Award, and Coach's Award. In a more holistic approach, there are three awards, the Spirit in Sports Award, Junior Knight Award, and Knight Award. The Spirit in Sports Award is presented to the athlete that displays outstanding school spirit, sportsmanship, and participation. The Junior Knight Award is presented to one male and one female from grades 9 and 10 who demonstrate outstanding dedication, skill, sportsmanship, and leadership. Likewise, the Knight Award is presented to one male and one female who demonstrate the same values described by the Junior Knight Award, however, it is presented to students from grades 11 and 12. Additionally, select seniors are recognized through two awards, The Blair Harcourt Award and the Farah Family Athletics and Leadership Award. The Blair Harcourt Award is presented to the senior with academic distinction, 3.3/4 GPA or higher, as well as athletic distinction, standing in parallel with the values of the Knight Award. The Farah Family Athletics and Leadership Award is presented to the senior who excels in the academic program at ACS Beirut, demonstrates leadership and commitment, and positively impacts the athletic and academic life at ACS Beirut.

== Notable alumni ==
- Stewart Copeland, drummer for The Police, whose father Miles Copeland Jr. was the longtime CIA station chief in Beirut
- Malcolm H. Kerr, historian
- Keanu Reeves, actor
- Bran Ferren, designer
- Steve Kerr, head coach of the Golden State Warriors
- Greg Kinnear, actor
- Omar Naim, director

== See also ==
- Education in the Ottoman Empire
