= Community Christian School (Bradenton, Florida) =

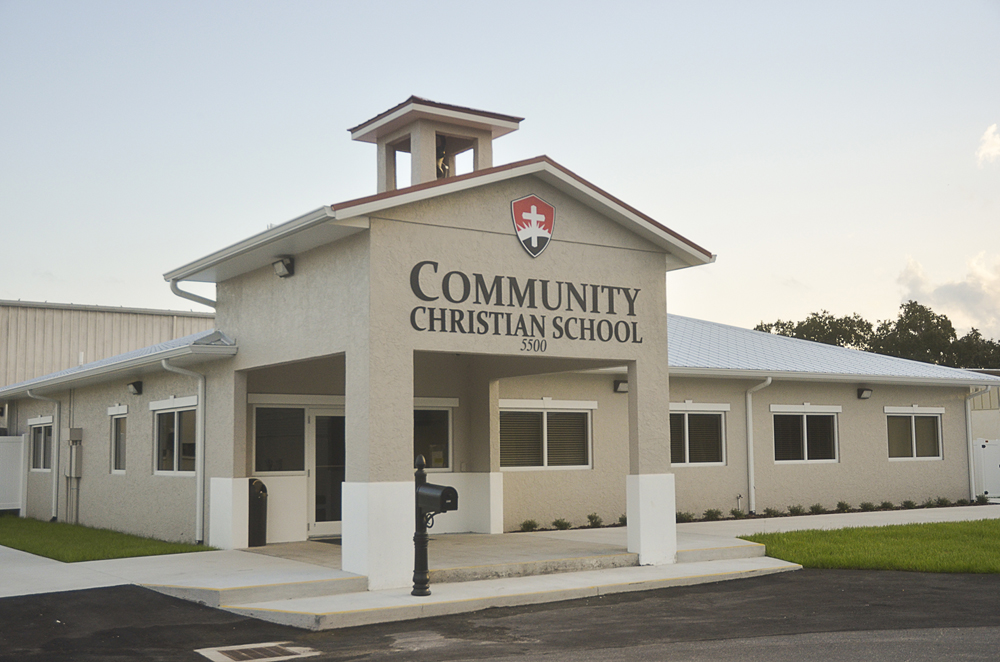
- Administrative building

Location
- 5500 18th Street East; Bradenton, Florida 34203; United States
- 27.4417°N 82.5405°W

Information
- Type: Private
- Motto: Home of the Crusaders
- Religious affiliation: Christian
- Established: 1968
- Founder: Community Baptist Church
- Administrator: Dan Moore
- Teaching staff: 25
- Grades: Nursery–12
- Enrollment: 445 (2023-2024)
- Campus size: 40 acres (16 ha)
- Campus type: Suburban
- Colors: red, black, white
- Mascot: Crusader
- Accreditations: Sunshine State Association of Christian Schools (SSACS), American Association of Christian Schools (AACS)
- Newspaper: The Communicator
- Website: www.communitychristianfl.org

Community Christian School (CCS) is a PreK–12 private, college preparatory Christian school in Bradenton, Florida, United States that was established in 1968 by Community Baptist Church.

== History ==
In the fall 1968, when many private schools were opening as a result of white flight, Community Baptist Church created Community Christian School with 56 students and 3 teachers in grades kindergarten through five. The school met, without accreditation, in the Community Baptist Church building. In 1969, the school experienced rapid growth to 120 students, partly in response to integration of the public schools in Palmetto, Florida. Principal William Allen, who was also the pastor of Community Baptist Church, stated "I can't say how much of this is due to integration, and I don't want anyone to think we are established to overcome these problems. Many parents are not as concerned with our positive view of Protestant Christian Influence, as they are of avoiding integration - but that's not why we are in existence". Allen expected steady growth in enrollment, "but there's no getting around that integration spurred it on faster than it normally would".

In 1970 construction was started on a new 40-acre campus. In 1971, there were 346 students and 23 teachers. In 1970, the still-unaccredited school touted that every teacher encouraged patriotism and encouraged Americanism, and that the school frankly discussed the dangers of communism. That year, the school competed in basketball and softball, with plans to add football and track in 1971.

In the spring of 1972 the school was accredited by the Florida Association of Christian Schools, which is now known as the American Association of Christian Schools (AACS). Science teaching was limited and sex education was prohibited, except "in the moral principals and ethics of the Divine scriptures." In 1972 the school had 5 buses.

In 1975, in response to a Federal court decision (Brown v. Dade Christian Schools) that prohibited Florida religious schools from denying admission to African-American students, Principal Bob Gay stated that Black students will be turned away if they are "sent here by the NAACP to cause problems". He said that Black students could be admitted if they desired education, but that "Just any person coming over can't get in regardless of race". At the time, the school had one black student, out of 468.

The school added one grade per year, resulting in the first senior class graduating in 1976.

== Accreditation ==
Community Christian School is a member of the Sunshine State Association of Christian Schools (SSACS) and the American Association of Christian Schools (AACS). CCS is nationally accredited by the American Association of Christian Schools (AACS) and regionally accredited through the North American Christian School Accrediting Agency (NACSAA).
