= Capsanthin/capsorubin synthase =

Identifiers
- EC no.: 5.3.99.8
- CAS no.: 162032-85-1

Databases
- IntEnz: IntEnz view
- BRENDA: BRENDA entry
- ExPASy: NiceZyme view
- KEGG: KEGG entry
- MetaCyc: metabolic pathway
- PRIAM: profile
- PDB structures: RCSB PDB PDBe PDBsum
Search
- PMC: articles
- PubMed: articles
- NCBI: proteins

Capsanthin/capsorubin synthase (EC 5.3.99.8, CCS, ketoxanthophyll synthase, capsanthin-capsorubin synthase) is an enzyme with systematic name violaxanthin—capsorubin isomerase (ketone-forming). This enzyme catalyses the following chemical reaction

(1) violaxanthin $\rightleftharpoons$ capsorubin
(2) antheraxanthin $\rightleftharpoons$ capsanthin

This multifunctional enzyme is induced during chromoplast differentiation in plants.
