= Chartered mark =

In the US, a chartered mark is a trademark or service mark that receives statutory protection separate from the usual registration of trade marks and service marks. A chartered mark, in effect, is a type of trademark/servicemark in which the organization is granted the mark "by charter", i.e. by express grant of the legislature. When an organization is granted a chartered mark, no one else may use the same mark at all for any purpose. (There are possible exceptions for organizations using the same or a similar mark before it was chartered.)

Examples of chartered marks in the United States include FDIC for the Federal Deposit Insurance Corporation; Boy Scouts and Girl Scouts for the Boy Scouts of America and the Girl Scouts of the USA, respectively; and Olympic for the United States Olympic Committee.
