= Conventional Commits =

Version control commit specification

Conventional Commits are a formatting standard for commits in version control systems. They distinguish code changes based on their purpose.

== Specification ==
The standard defines the following format:

<type>[optional scope]: <description>
[optional body]
[optional footer(s)]

The specification defines only two classification types.

- feat: introducing new features to the codebase
- fix: fixing a bug in the codebase

Unspecified types are allowed, for example, build, for changes to the building of the codebase, which is derived from Angular, and chore, for changes not affecting production code, which was introduced by Conventional Commits.

== History ==
The nature of managing open source software projects necessitates a structured way to interpret commits, and commit classification emerged as a way to improve software quality and maintainability. Conventional Commits originates from the commit format of the Angular repository, and mostly inherits its classification types. While these projects were not the first to introduce classification to commit messages, unlike earlier systems, their classifications had a level of granularity not present in earlier systems, which allowed for deeper resulting analysis, and were chosen to be mutually exclusive.

== Adoption ==
A 2025 study found that, of 381 randomly selected JavaScript projects on GitHub, 360 contained commits formatted according to Conventional Commits, and 198 of those had 80% or more of their commits formatted this way. In projects that had not adopted Conventional Commits, 10% of commits adhered to the standard anyways.
