= Community Christian School (Tallahassee, Florida) =

Private school in Florida, United States

Coordinates: 30°32′17.6″N 84°12′56.8″W

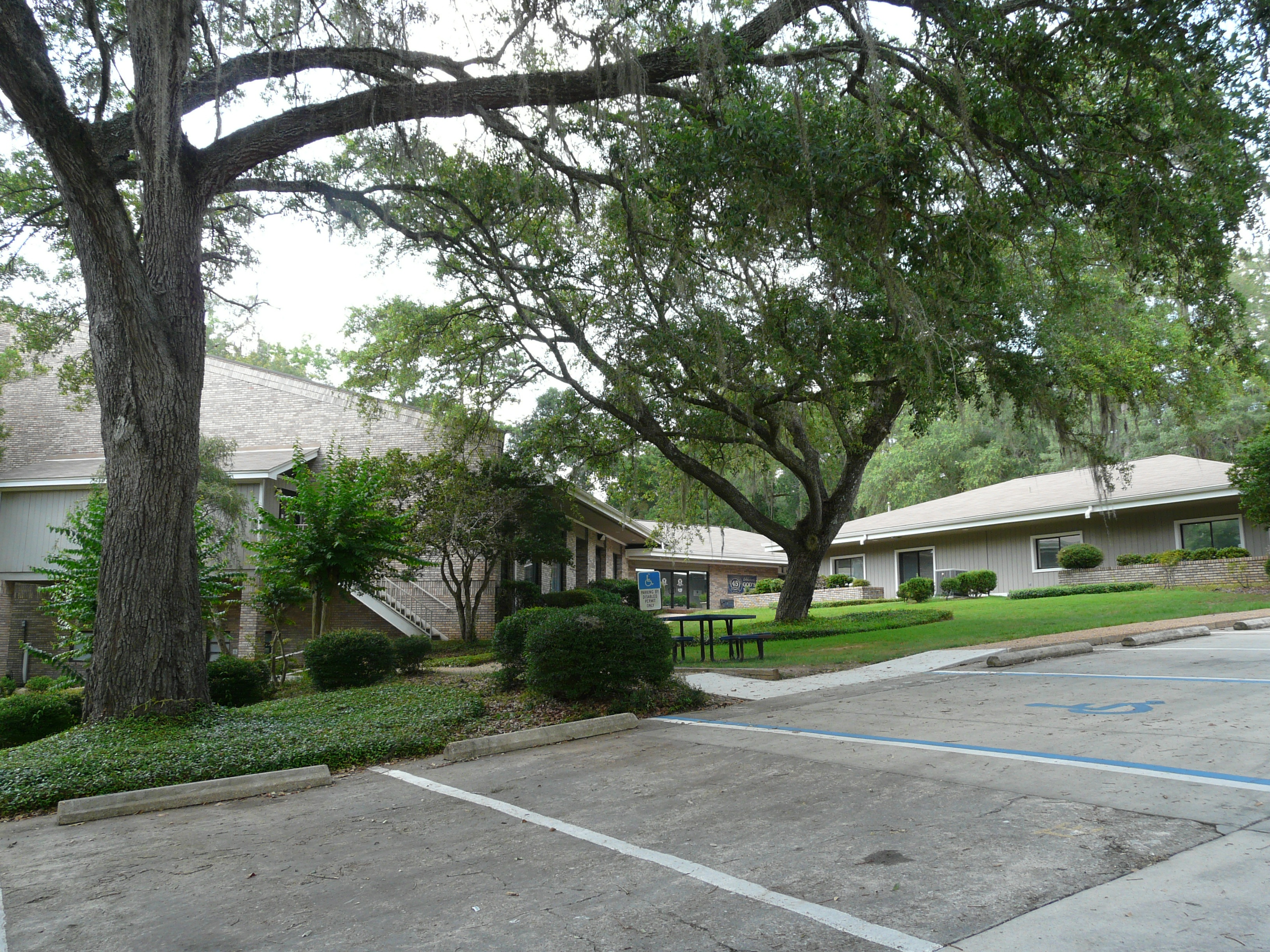
- Main campus
- Tallahassee, Florida; United States

Information
- Type: Private Christian school

Community Christian School (CCS) is a private Christian school located in Tallahassee, Florida for grades K–12. According to its website site, tuition in 2017–2018 was $7,990 per year.

== Athletics ==
The athletics at CCS include cross-country, women's court volleyball, and swimming in the fall; soccer and basketball in the winter; and track and field, tennis, and women's sand volleyball in the spring. The school also has intramural sports.

=== Intramural ===
In elementary, the students can participate in intramural sports including flag-football, soccer, and T-ball. The middle- and high-schoolers also have a sand volleyball intramural.

== Academics ==
CCS offers a speech class for juniors. In speech class, students research a Biblical perspective of world events and prepare a speech that is performed in the auditorium.

== Leadership program ==
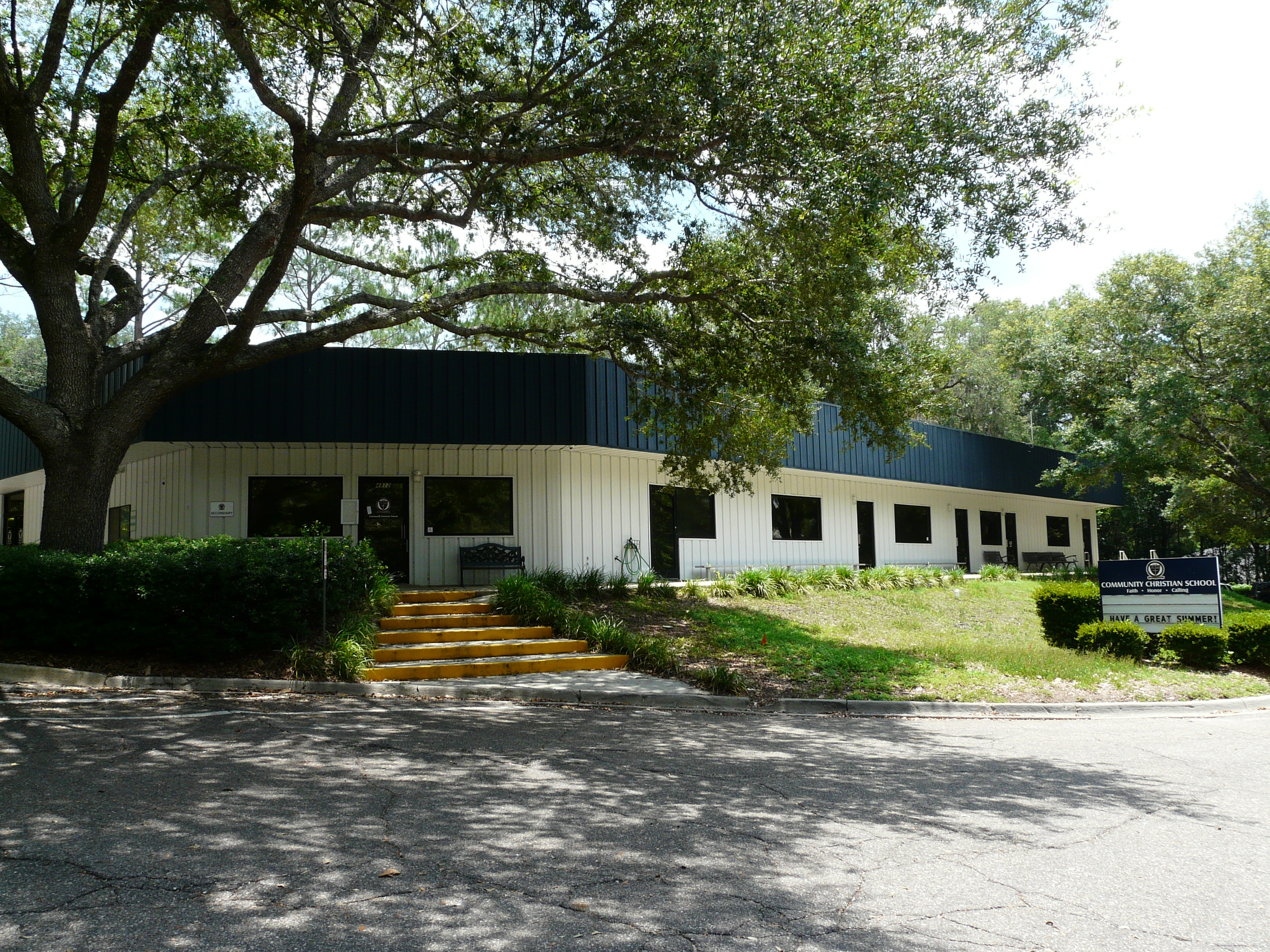
Secondary campus

The leadership program leads high school students through community service, survival skills, learning independence, and the pursuit of a relationship with God. The students are taken on a number of events throughout the year including the biannual Senior and Junior trip to Panama City, Panama and the biannual trip to the Navajo Nation in Arizona.
