= Montessori Oberschule Potsdam =

Coordinates: 52°23′20″N 13°00′48″E

- Potsdam, Brandenburg, Germany

Information
- Type: Public school
- Motto: Schule mit besonderer Prägung - School with particular education
- Established: 1961
- Principal: Sebastian Raphael
- Teaching staff: 40
- Enrollment: 460
- Website: www.potsdam-montessori.de

Montessori Oberschule Potsdam, located at Schlüterstraße 2 D-14471 in west Potsdam, Germany, is a Montessori school. It is a public school integrated with a two-year high school (Gymnasium) that follows the Montessori method, or teachings of Maria Montessori. The Head of the school is Ulrike Kegler.

== Organization ==
The school has about 400 students from the German Federal States of Brandenburg and Berlin. It starts in the 'Ersteklasse' (first grade) and makes its way to the tenth. Seventh and eighth graders do not have homework although they must regularly produce reports for their classes.

Instead of having one class for each grade, there are multiple classes with three or two grades. 1st through 3rd are together, 4th through 6th are as well, with the 7th-8th and 9th-10th in their own rooms too. The 1st through 6th grades are located on the first floor, the 9th-10th are on the second and the 7th-8th are on the third.

As most schools in Land Brandenburg (and in Germany), the Oberschule only has six weeks for Sommerferien, summer break. They have two weeks off in October, two for Weihnachtsferien, Christmas break, one week for a winter break in February, and two for Osterferien, Easter break. School ends in July and starts in August.

== History ==
The Karl-Liebknecht-Oberschule, predecessor to Montessori-Gesamtschule was built in between 1957 and 1961. The student body quickly became 1000 students. In 1973, there were arranged classes with expanded Russian instruction from the third class.

The former "Polytechnische Oberschule" became transformed into a combined elementary school and a middle school/high school. It performed with an extensively received apprenticeship personnel, a further change toward the Montessori education. In 2000, the school was renamed "Montessori-Oberschule-Potsdam". In 2002, the school received the first prize in "Innovative Schools in the State of Brandenburg".

In the 2004/2005 school year, the school took the Denkmal-Aktiv-Project of the German endowment of monument protection. The students used their abilities (art, natural science, spiritual science, German) with the restoration of the marble sculptures in the palace gardens of Sanssouci Park.

== Exchange programs ==
Montessori Oberschule Potsdam has two exchanges held in alternate school years.

The first is an American-German exchange program with their partner school Franciscan Montessori Earth School/St. Francis Academy located in Portland, Oregon. There have been three exchanges so far 2002, 2004, and 2006. The most recent one was done with the German exchange from October 1 to October 14, 2005. The American exchange on March 19 to April 1. The hope is that the next exchange will happen sometime in late 2007 and early 2008.

The other exchange is a French-German exchange. Students go for three months near the end of the school year to a boarding school in France. Each student has a partner. After the end of school, the students spend a few weeks at home with their partner. The French students come over to stay with their partner for the end of the Sommerferien and three months of the school year.
