= Coventry Christian Schools =

Private school in Pottstown, Pennsylvania, United States

Location
- 699 North Pleasantview Road; Pottstown, Pennsylvania 19464; United States; 40.2506°N 75.5930°W

Information
- Type: Private Christian
- Motto: Ut vitam habeant
- Established: 1984; 42 years ago
- Headmaster: John Mark Niehls
- Grades: Pre-K-12
- Enrollment: Coeducational
- Colors: Blue and white
- Athletics: CCS Eagles
- Accreditation: NCSA
- Website: www.coventrychristian.com

Coventry Christian Schools (CCS) is a pre-K-12 classical Christian school located in Pottstown, Pennsylvania, United States. It was founded by superintendent Mark E. Niehls. CCS first opened its doors in 1984 with only seven students in a two-morning preschool taught by two volunteer teacher. It is affiliated with, but not accredited by, the Association of Classical Christian Schools.

== School history ==
1983 – Preliminary plans to open a preschool finalized. Curriculum is developed and supplies obtained. Registration with the Pennsylvania Department of Education and 501c(3) tax exemption status received from Internal Revenue Service.

1984 – The school is incorporated and opens its first academic year in September with seven students in a two morning preschool class taught by two volunteer teachers.

1985 – A full-day kindergarten class is added and preschool is expanded.

1986 – First grade is added.

1987 – Second grade is added. The 5.2 acre (21,000 m^{2}) property at 962 East Schuylkill Road is purchased. 2,000 sq ft (190 m^{2}) of usable space becomes available in the renovated schoolhouse.

1989 – The newly renovated property on Schuylkill Road opens to first through third grades. Preschool and kindergarten remain at the Coventry Hills church building.

1993 – Five temporary classroom trailers installed to provide expanded instructional space.

1994 – The first permanent addition adds 3200 square feet (300 m^{2}) and six new classrooms and new restrooms.

1995 – A second permanent addition adds 6400 sq ft (600 m^{2}) of space providing a large multipurpose room and preschool with three large classrooms and a kitchen. An additional 0.8 acre (3200 m^{2}) of adjacent property was purchased bringing the total campus area to 6 acres (24,000 m^{2}). All students move to Coventry Campus. Eighth grade is added.

1996 – The 4 acre (16,000 m^{2}) athletic field is professionally leveled and seeded allowing for playground expansion and home games in soccer and field hockey.

1998 – 9,500 sq ft (880 m^{2}) of new instructional space constructed. This space included an art room, computer lab, library, science lab, and nine new classrooms. Total space is 21,000 sq ft (2,000 m^{2}). High School expansion begins.

2000 – 2.3 acres (9,300 m^{2}) of adjacent property is purchased for future expansion. The school receives $1 million bequest from the Penrose Keller estate. Total campus area is 9 acres (36,000 m^{2}). Temporary modular facility installed to accommodate secondary expansion.

2001 - Coventry Christian Schools graduates its first senior class.

2002 – Full accreditation received through the National Christian School Association. The first comprehensive capital campaign is launched at CCS.

2003 – 13.2 acre (53,000 m^{2}) Pleasantview campus purchased for new preschool site and secondary program. School building has nearly 52,000 sq ft (4800 m^{2}) of instructional space containing 22 classrooms, library, cafeteria and kitchen.

2009 - Groundbreaking ceremony for planned event center.

2010 - Event center completed.

2011 - Elementary program moved to Pleasantview campus.

== School sports ==
The athletic program at CCS is a voluntary after-school program designed to supplement the physical education classes and recesses that the students participate in during the regular school hours.

CCS plays Volleyball (Girls only), Soccer (Boys in fall and girls in spring), Basketball (Both Boys and Girls), Lacrosse (Boys only) and support a Cross Country team. The CCS eagles mascot is Talon, the eagle.

== Campus ==
The campus is located at 699 North Pleasantview Road, Pottstown, Pennsylvania 19464. It has over 51,000 square feet (4,700 m^{2}) of instructional space, which serves a new preschool program as well as Kindergarten through 12th grades. There are 20 classrooms as well as an art room, multipurpose room/gym, chapel, library, school store, cafeteria, science lab, and administrative offices. The building is located on over 12 acres (49,000 m^{2}) of CCS property which borders the township park.

This campus is also the meeting place of the Chesmont Church of Christ, which convenes in the chapel.
