= Little Shop of Horrors (film) =

1986 film directed by Frank Oz

- Theatrical release poster
- Directed by: Frank Oz
- Screenplay by: Howard Ashman
- Based on: Little Shop of Horrors (1982 musical) by Howard Ashman; The Little Shop of Horrors (1960 film) by Roger Corman Charles B. Griffith
- Produced by: David Geffen
- Starring: Rick Moranis; Ellen Greene; Vincent Gardenia; Steve Martin; James Belushi; John Candy; Christopher Guest; Bill Murray
- Cinematography: Robert Paynter
- Edited by: John Jympson
- Music by: Miles Goodman (score); Alan Menken (songs)
- Production company: The Geffen Company
- Distributed by: Warner Bros.
- Release date: December 19, 1986
- Running time: 94 minutes
- Country: United States
- Language: English
- Budget: $25 million
- Box office: $54 million

Little Shop of Horrors is a 1986 American horror comedy musical film directed by Frank Oz. It is an adaptation of the off-Broadway 1982 musical Little Shop of Horrors by composer Alan Menken and writer Howard Ashman, which is itself an adaptation of the 1960 film The Little Shop of Horrors by screenwriter Charles B. Griffith and director Roger Corman. The film stars Rick Moranis, Ellen Greene, Vincent Gardenia, Steve Martin, Levi Stubbs as the voice of Audrey II, and introducing Tisha Campbell, Tichina Arnold, and Michelle Weeks in the film debuts as well as special appearances by Jim Belushi, John Candy, Christopher Guest, and Bill Murray. The film, which centers on a floral shop worker who discovers a sentient carnivorous plant that feeds on human blood, was produced by David Geffen through The Geffen Company and released by Warner Bros. on December 19, 1986. The film grossed $39 million domestically and $15 million internationally for a worldwide total of $54 million.

Little Shop of Horrors was filmed on the Albert R. Broccoli 007 Stage at the Pinewood Studios in England, where a "downtown" set, complete with overhead train track, was constructed. Produced on a budget of $25 million, in contrast to the original 1960 film, which, according to Corman, only cost $30,000, it was well received by critics and audiences alike, eventually developing a cult following. The film's original 23-minute finale, based on the musical's ending, was rewritten and reshot after test audiences did not react positively to it. For years only available as black-and-white workprint footage, the original ending was fully restored in 2012 by Warner Home Video and a director's cut was released.

== Plot ==
In the early 1960s, a motown three-girl "Greek chorus" – Crystal, Ronette and Chiffon – introduce the film, warning the audience of some impending horror ("Prologue: Little Shop of Horrors").

Orphaned Seymour Krelborn and his co-worker, Audrey, work at Mushnik's Flower Shop in the rough, rundown Skid Row neighborhood of New York City, which they lament that they cannot escape ("Skid Row (Downtown)"). Struggling from a lack of customers, Mr. Mushnik decides to close the store, but Audrey suggests he may have more success by displaying an unusual plant that Seymour owns. Immediately attracting a customer, Seymour explains he bought the plant – which he dubbed "Audrey II" – from a Chinese flower shop during a solar eclipse ("Da-Doo"). The plant brings much business to Mushnik's shop but soon starts to wither. Seymour accidentally pricks his finger and discovers that Audrey II needs human blood to thrive ("Grow for Me").

Soon after, Audrey II begins to grow rapidly, and earns Seymour a spot on energetic DJ Wink Wilkinson's radio show, making him a local celebrity. Meanwhile, Audrey suffers at the hands of her sadistic and evil biker boyfriend, Orin Scrivello; however, she has feelings for Seymour and secretly dreams of being married and living happily with him in the suburbs ("Somewhere That's Green").

Seymour continues to feed Audrey II his own blood, draining his energy ("Some Fun Now"). He attempts to ask Audrey out, but she turns him down because she has a date with Orin, who is revealed to be a dentist who enjoys his patients' misery ("Dentist!"). After Seymour closes up shop, Audrey II finally has a chance to speak to Seymour, demanding more blood than Seymour can give. The plant suggests that Seymour murder someone, promising to bring him fame and fortune that will impress Audrey. Seymour initially refuses but eventually agrees after he witnesses Orin physically and verbally abusing Audrey in the street ("Feed Me (Git It!)").

After Orin finishes with his masochistic patient, Arthur Denton, who had requested "a long, slow, root canal", Seymour draws a revolver on Orin, but cannot bring himself to use it. Orin, who abuses nitrous oxide, puts on a type of venturi mask to receive a constant flow of the gas, but breaks the valve, and Seymour watches as he asphyxiates. Seymour dismembers Orin's body and feeds it to Audrey II, which has grown to enormous size, but is unknowingly witnessed by Mushnik, who flees in fear.

Audrey, feeling guilty over Orin's disappearance, is comforted by Seymour and the two admit their feelings for each other ("Suddenly, Seymour"). That night, Mushnik confronts Seymour about Orin's death. Holding Seymour at gunpoint, Mushnik threatens to turn Seymour over to the police but then he has a change in heart because of how Orin treated Audrey and didn't really care for him. Mushnik decides to have Seymour leave Skid Row for 40 years and Seymour agrees, but in order to leave town, Seymour must surrender Audrey II to Mushnik. Audrey II opens its mouth to feed, Seymour begins to tell Mushnik how to care for the plant and backs him into the plant's reach. The plant swallows Mushnik whole ("Suppertime").

After Mushnik's disappearance, Seymour is offered multiple contracts that promise him money and fame ("The Meek Shall Inherit"). Torn between continuing his partnership with the plant and the thought of losing Audrey if he's no longer successful, Seymour becomes overwhelmed. Audrey congratulates Seymour on a contract for a botany TV show and tells Seymour the producers will return with the money the following day. Seeing a way out, Seymour proposes to Audrey, asking her to marry him that afternoon. He'll take the money in the morning and escape Skid Row with Audrey, leaving the plant to starve. After Audrey accepts Seymour's marriage proposal, Audrey II catches Seymour leaving and demands another meal: Seymour agrees but insists on meat from a butcher. While Seymour is gone, the plant telephones Audrey, coaxes her into the shop and attacks her ("Suppertime II").

=== Original ending ===
Audrey II is about to eat Audrey and tells her to join Orin and Mushnik. Seymour arrives and pulls Audrey from the plant's jaws but she is mortally wounded. Before Audrey dies, Seymour exposes the truth saying that he fed Orin and Mushnik to Audrey II because of how they treated them. Seymour sadly fulfills Audrey's dying wish to be fed to the plant so that it can live and Seymour can earn the success he deserves ("Somewhere That's Green" (reprise)). Seymour attempts to kill himself by jumping off of the shop's roof, but learns that botanical executive Patrick Martin plans to propagate and sell Audrey IIs with or without Seymour's consent while having made a prototype from a cutting he secretly obtained. Realizing that Audrey II is planning global conquest, Seymour resolves to destroy the plant. Audrey II reveals that it is an extraterrestrial as it tears down the shop, fishes Seymour from the rubble and eats him alive ("Mean Green Mother from Outer Space"). Subsequently, as the three chorus girls explain, Audrey II buds became a worldwide craze. Fueled by the greed of their owners who provided them with blood, the Audrey II buds grew into an army of monstrous plants that began to take over the Earth. Giant Audrey II plants are shown toppling buildings and feeding on people, with the United States Army notably fighting the buds ascending the Statue of Liberty ("Finale (Don't Feed the Plants)"). An Audrey II suddenly bursts out of the screen as a close-up of its mouth is seen.

=== Theatrical ending ===
Returning in time to save Audrey, Seymour escapes the store with her. Explaining that he fed the plant to become successful and win Audrey's heart, Seymour discovers she has always loved him ("Suddenly, Seymour" (reprise)). Approached by an executive named Patrick Martin from a botanical company, Seymour is offered a contract to breed Audrey II and sell the saplings worldwide. Horrified by the idea, Seymour drives Martin away and realizes he must destroy Audrey II for the sake of humanity. Returning to the shop, Seymour learns that Audrey II is actually an alien from outer space ("Mean Green Mother from Outer Space"). Audrey II then traps Seymour and destroys the shop, but Seymour retaliates by using an exposed electrical cable in the rubble to electrocute Audrey II, vanquishing it. Leaving the destroyed shop, Seymour safely reunites with Audrey and the two wed and move to the suburbs. Unnoticed by the newlyweds, an Audrey II sprout lurks in their garden.

== Cast ==
- Levi Stubbs as the voice of Audrey II, an evil and boisterous flytrap-like extraterrestrial plant that feeds on human blood and seeks world domination. Stubbs is credited as "Levi Stubbs of The Four Tops"
  - Stubbs also makes a quick, in-person cameo appearance during the film's "Skid Row" number as a citizen singing "Down on Skid–!".
    - Parts of the original ending had Frank Oz providing Audrey II's laughter when Stubbs was unable to provide it.
  - Anthony Asbury, Brian Henson, Mak Wilson, Robert Tygner, Sue Dacre, David Barclay, Marcus Clarke, Paul Springer, David Greenaway, Toby Philpott, Michael Bayliss, Michael Barclay, Don Austen, Chris Leith, William Todd-Jones, Terry Lee, Ian Tregonning, John Alexander, Michael Quinn, James Barton, and Graham Fletcher were all principal puppeteers for Audrey II.
- Rick Moranis as Seymour Krelborn, a nerdy florist who loves "strange and interesting" plants. He is nice and well-intentioned, but is easily influenced: the plant, Audrey II, tricks him into feeding it humans by simply showing his love interest's romantic troubles to his face, which he then immediately grows enraged over.
- Ellen Greene as Audrey, a kind, shy and awkward coworker who is the object of Seymour's affections, but who is dating the sadistic Orin Scrivello. Greene reprises her role from the original theatrical production.
- Vincent Gardenia as Mr. Mushnik, the grumpy, stingy owner of Mushnik's Flower Shop.
- Steve Martin as Orin Scrivello, DDS, a sadistic, nitrous oxide-addicted dentist and Audrey's violent, abusive boyfriend.
- Tichina Arnold, Michelle Weeks, and Tisha Campbell as Crystal, Ronette, and Chiffon, three key characters who act as a Greek chorus and lead the film's narrative by providing both principal story-telling through songs and by lending back-up vocals and harmony for the songs performed by protagonists and the antagonist, Audrey II.
- James Belushi as Patrick Martin, a Licensing and Marketing executive from World Botanical Enterprises who offers Seymour a proposal to sell Audrey IIs worldwide.
  - Paul Dooley portrayed Patrick Martin in the original ending. When Dooley was unavailable for re-shoots, the role was recast to Belushi in the theatrical release.
- John Candy as Wink Wilkinson, the DJ for WSKID who puts on a radio show about "weird stuff" called "Wink Wilkinson's Weird World".
- Christopher Guest as The First Customer, the first customer to enter the flower shop and notice Audrey II.
- Bill Murray as Arthur Denton, a hyperactive masochist who visits Orin the dentist for "a long, slow root canal." His character is not part of the stage play, but is based on Wilbur Force, a character from the original 1960 film played by a young Jack Nicholson.
- Stanley Jones as the Narrator, whose voice is heard reading the opening words.
- Bertice Reading as "Downtown" Old Woman, who opens the "Skid Row" number bringing a bag of items to her townhouse
- Ed Wiley as "Downtown" Bum #1, who is heard during "Skid Row" singing "Then you go--"
- Alan Tilvern as "Downtown" Bum #2
- John Scott Martin as "Downtown" Bum #3
- Vincent Wong as the Chinese florist on whose stand Seymour found Audrey II following the eclipse
- Mak Wilson, Danny John-Jules, Danny Cunningham, Gary Palmer and Paul Swaby as the doo-wop backup singers.
- Miriam Margolyes as a Dental Nurse, Orin's cynical nurse/secretary whom Orin frequently appears to enjoy hurting.
- Heather Henson (daughter of Jim Henson) cameos as one of Orin's patients.
- Judith Morse as the girl's mother
- Kerry Shale as a Life magazine assistant

== Musical numbers ==
- "Prologue: Little Shop of Horrors" – Chiffon, Ronette, Crystal
- "Skid Row (Downtown)" – Seymour, Audrey, Mushnik, Chiffon, Ronette, Crystal, Company
- "Da-Doo" – Seymour, Chiffon, Ronette, Crystal
- "Grow for Me" – Seymour, Chiffon, Ronette, Crystal (off-screen)
- "Somewhere That's Green" – Audrey
- "Some Fun Now" – Chiffon, Ronette, Crystal
- "Dentist!" – Orin, Chiffon, Ronette, Crystal
- "Feed Me (Git It!)" – Audrey II, Seymour
- "Suddenly, Seymour" – Seymour, Audrey, Chiffon, Ronette, Crystal
- "Suppertime" – Audrey II, Chiffon, Ronette, Crystal
- "The Meek Shall Inherit" – Chiffon, Ronette, Crystal, Company
- "Suppertime II" – Audrey II, Audrey, Chiffon, Ronette and Crystal (off-screen)
- "Suddenly, Seymour" (reprise) – Audrey, Seymour
- "Mean Green Mother from Outer Space" – Audrey II, the Pods
- "Little Shop of Horrors medley" (end credits) – Company

=== Director's cut ending ===
- "Somewhere That's Green" (reprise) – Audrey, Seymour
- "Mean Green Mother from Outer Space" – Audrey II, the Pods
- "Finale (Don't Feed the Plants)" – Chiffon, Ronette, Crystal, Company
- "Little Shop of Horrors medley" (end credits) – Company

=== Charts ===
Chart (1987)	Peak position
Australia (Kent Music Report)	47

== Production ==
=== Development ===
David Geffen was one of the original producers of the off-Broadway show and he began planning to produce a feature film adaptation. Author and lyricist Howard Ashman began writing the screenplay in late 1982. Originally Steven Spielberg was attached to serve as an executive producer with Martin Scorsese attached to direct the film, which he wanted to shoot in 3D, but production was stalled when a lawsuit was filed by the original film's screenwriter and actor, Charles B. Griffith. John Landis was also attached to the project in 1984. Music producer and Four Seasons member Bob Gaudio adapted and produced the musical's songs for the film.

Geffen then offered the film to Frank Oz, who was finishing work on The Muppets Take Manhattan around the same time. Oz initially rejected it, but later had an idea that interested him in the cinematic aspect of the project. Oz spent a month and a half restructuring the script which he felt was stage-bound. Geffen and Ashman liked what he had written and decided to run with it. Oz was also studying the Off-Broadway show and how it was thematically constructed, in order to reconstruct it for a feature film.

The original cut of the film differs only slightly from the stage play. The title song is expanded to include an additional verse to allow for the opening credits. The song "Ya Never Know" was rewritten into a calypso-inspired song called "Some Fun Now", although some of the lyrics were retained. Four other songs ("Closed for Renovation", "Mushnik and Son", "Now [It's Just the Gas]", as well as "Call Back in the Morning") were cut from the original production score, and "Finale (Don't Feed the Plants)" does not appear in the theatrical release of the film. A new song, "Mean Green Mother from Outer Space", was written by Ashman and Menken for the film.

=== Casting ===
Greene, who portrayed Audrey in the original off-Broadway production, was not originally set to reprise her role. The studio wanted Cyndi Lauper, who turned it down. Barbra Streisand was also rumored to have been offered the part. After Greene's casting, Oz described her as "amazing," and said, "I couldn't imagine any other Audrey, really. She nailed that part for years off-Broadway." The character of the masochistic dental patient (who in Corman's original film was named Wilbur Force and played by Jack Nicholson) was cut from the stage version but added back to the new film, renamed Arthur Denton, and played by Bill Murray, who improvised all of his dialogue. Before Oz cast Murray as Arthur Denton, he also considered another actor for the role. It supposedly took Steve Martin six weeks to film all his scenes as Orin. He contributed ideas such as socking the nurse in the face (originally he was to knock her out using his motorbike helmet) and ripping off the doll head.

=== Filming ===
All the scenes were filmed at Pinewood Studios in England, making use of every sound stage there, including the 007 Stage. Oz and his crew did not want to shoot on location as it would tamper with the fantastical mood of the film. Part of the giant 007 stage was used to film the "Suddenly Seymour" number. Because of its size, the stage was impractical to heat properly and thus caused breath condensation to appear from the actor's lips. This was countered by having Ellen Greene and Rick Moranis put ice cubes in their mouths.

This would be the first time Moranis and Steve Martin starred in a film together, and they would later appear together in three more films: Parenthood, My Blue Heaven and L.A. Story.

As mentioned, additional sequences and songs from the original off-Broadway show were dropped or re-written in order for the feature version to be paced well. The notable change was for the "Meek Shall Inherit" sequence. As originally filmed, it detailed through a dream sequence Seymour's rising success and the need to keep the plant fed and impress Audrey. In the final cut, the dream sequence and much of the song is cut out. Oz said, "I cut that because I felt it just didn't work and that was before the first preview in San Jose. It was the right choice, it didn't really add value to the entire cut." The full version of the song was included on the film's soundtrack album, as were the songs from the original ending.

Another notable cut scene is an extended version of Seymour dismembering Orin's body for Audrey II, which would have featured a longer, more drawn out scene of Seymour hacking away at Orin's corpse. The scene also featured a prosthetic head resembling Steve Martin's likeness, which can only be seen from behind in known early versions of the film, but the front of which can be seen in various behind-the-scenes photos and promotional material. According to Frank Oz's director commentary included in home releases of the film, the shot of the prosthetic head was cut for being too scary.

=== Operating the plant ===
The film's version of Audrey II was an elaborate creation, using puppets designed by Lyle Conway, who had previously worked with Oz on The Muppet Show, The Dark Crystal, and The Great Muppet Caper. The animatronic and fabrication team consisted of many of the same people who had worked on the creatures in Labyrinth.

While developing the mouth of the plant for the dialogue scenes and musical numbers, Oz, Conway and his crew struggled to figure out how to make the plant move convincingly. "We kept trying and trying and it didn't work." The solution presented itself while reviewing test footage of the puppet. When the film ran backwards or forward at a faster than normal speed, the footage looked more convincing and lifelike. They realized they could film the puppet at a slower speed, making it appear to move faster when played back at normal speed. "By slowing it down it looked it was talking real fast. We then went 'holy cow, look at that. We can do it.'" The frame rate for filming the plant was slowed to 12 or 16 frames per second, depending on the scene, and frequent screen cuts were used to minimize the amount of screen time the puppet spent with human actors; when interaction was necessary, the actors (usually Moranis) would pantomime and lip sync in slow motion. The film was then sped up to the normal 24 frames per second and voices were reinserted in post-production. Levi Stubbs' recordings were pitch-shifted through a Harmonizer when slowed down so that they were coherent for Moranis or Ellen Greene.

There are no blue screens or opticals involved in any of Audrey II's scenes, with the exception of the reshot ending where the plant is electrocuted, designed by Visual Effects supervisor Bran Ferren, and in some shots during the rampage in the original ending. The plant was made in six different stages of growth and there were three different versions of Mushnik's shop, making it possible for two units to work with different sized plants at the same time. Each of the talking plants had to be cleaned, re-painted and patched up at the end of each shooting day, which would take up to three hours depending on the size. The "Suppertime" number uses two different sizes of Audrey II. When "Twoey" is singing all alone in the shop, it is actually a smaller size: the same size as when it sang "Feed Me", but now standing on a scaled down set to make it appear larger. The full size one that is seen to interact with Seymour and Mushnik was not provided with lip movement, but was built to swallow Mushnik's (mechanical) legs. Performing the plant in its largest form required around 60 puppeteers, many of whom had worked with director Frank Oz on previous projects, including The Dark Crystal, Labyrinth and Return of the Jedi, and would go on to puppeteer in Who Framed Roger Rabbit, The Muppet Christmas Carol, and Muppet Treasure Island.

=== The finale ===
Audrey II on top of the Statue of Liberty in the film's planned ending.

Oz and Ashman wanted to retain the ending of the musical where Seymour and Audrey get eaten and the plant succeeds and takes over the city of New York, but Geffen was against it. "He said you can't do that", Oz recounts. "But again he knew what Howard and I wanted to do, so he supported us." A special effects team skilled in working with miniatures went to great lengths to create the finale. The model department was supervised by Richard Conway, known for his model work on Flash Gordon and Brazil. "It was all model stuff, that was the brilliant thing. He created the bridge, the buildings, several Audrey IIs and created all of it, all on tabletop. It's all old-fashioned, tabletop animation" (although no stop motion animation was used in the film or in the ending). The visual effects work was supervised by Bran Ferren (Altered States).

Reportedly the entire planned climax cost about $5 million to produce. Oz said in an interview, "this was, I think, the most expensive film Warner Bros. had done at the time." As the film was nearing completion, the excited studio set up a test screening in San Jose. Oz said, "For every musical number, there was applause, they loved it, it was just fantastic... until Rick and Ellen died, and then the theatre became a refrigerator, an ice box. It was awful and the cards were just awful. You have to have a 55 percent 'recommend' to really be released and we got a 13. It was a complete disaster." Oz insisted on setting another test screening in L.A. to see if they would get a different reaction. Geffen agreed to this, but they received the same negative reaction as before. Oz later recounted, "I learned a lesson: in a stage play, you kill the leads and they come out for a bow—in a movie, they don't come out for a bow, they're dead. They're gone and so the audience lost the people they loved, as opposed to the theater audience where they knew the two people who played Audrey and Seymour were still alive. They loved those people, and they hated us for it."

Oz and Ashman scrapped Audrey and Seymour's grim deaths and the finale rampage, and Ashman rewrote a happier ending, with Jim Belushi replacing Paul Dooley (who was unavailable for the re-shoot) as Patrick Martin. The musical number "Mean Green Mother from Outer Space" was left mostly intact from the original cut, with new shots of Audrey observing from a window added in. A brief sequence from the "Mean Green Mother" number was also removed in which Seymour fires his revolver at Audrey II, only to discover that the bullets ricochet harmlessly off of the plant. In the happy ending, Audrey II is destroyed and Seymour, Audrey, and humanity survive. This happy ending is made somewhat ambiguous, however, with a final shot of a smiling Audrey II bud in Seymour and Audrey's front yard. Tisha Campbell was unavailable for the final appearance of the chorus girls in the yard and was replaced with a stand-in seen only from the waist down.

"We had to do it," Oz recounted. "[and do it] in such a manner that the audience would enjoy the movie. It was very dissatisfying for both of us that we couldn't do what we wanted. So creatively, no, it didn't satisfy us and being true to the story. But we also understood the realities that they couldn't release the movie if we had that ending." "We had to take [the workprint] apart, and we never made a dupe of [the original ending]." At the time, the only copies of it that were made to be viewed were VHS workprint tapes given to few crew members. The scene in which Seymour proposes to Audrey originally contained the reprise of "Suddenly, Seymour". This scene was re-shot and the reprise was placed later in the new ending. In the final theatrical cut, the only miniatures that are retained are the New York City streets passing behind Steve Martin's motorcycle ride at the beginning of "Dentist!" "When we did re-shoot the ending, the crowd reaction went over 50 percent in our favor. Before it was a point where they hated it so much, Warner probably wouldn't even release the movie", Oz said.

== Release ==
=== Box office ===
Little Shop of Horrors, after a delay needed to complete the revised ending, was released on December 19, 1986, and was anticipated to do strong business over the 1986 holiday season. The film grossed $39 million at the box office in the United States and Canada, which, from the viewpoint of the studio, was considered an underperformer. Internationally, it grossed $15 million, for a worldwide total of $54 million. However, it became a smash hit upon its home video release in 1987 on VHS and Beta.

=== Critical reception ===
Rotten Tomatoes retrospectively collected reviews to give Little Shop of Horrors a score of 92% based on reviews from 60 critics, with an average rating of 7.5/10. The general consensus states, "Remixing Roger Corman's B-movie by way of the Off-Broadway musical, Little Shop of Horrors offers camp, horror and catchy tunes in equal measure—plus some inspired cameos by the likes of Steve Martin and Bill Murray." On Metacritic, which uses an average of critics' reviews, the film has an 81% rating based on 15 reviews, indicating "universal acclaim" (14 positive reviews, 1 mixed, and no negative). Richard Corliss of Time magazine said, "You can try not liking this adaptation of the Off-Broadway musical hit -- it has no polish and a pushy way with a gag -- but the movie sneaks up on you, about as subtly as Audrey II." Audiences polled by CinemaScore gave the film an average grade of "A−" on an A+ to F scale.

In The New York Times, Janet Maslin called it "a full-blown movie musical, and quite a winning one". Roger Ebert gave it 3 1/2 stars, writing, "All of the wonders of Little Shop of Horrors are accomplished with an offhand, casual charm. This is the kind of movie that cults are made of, and after Little Shop finishes its first run, I wouldn't be at all surprised to see it develop as one of those movies that fans want to include in their lives." Gene Siskel also gave it 3 1/2 stars, calling it "one of the best and certainly funniest musicals in years," and listing it as a runner-up for his ten best films of 1986. Oz's friend and Muppet colleague Jim Henson praised the film and said "the lip sync on the plant in that film is just absolutely amazing."

=== Accolades ===
The film was nominated for two Academy Awards. "Mean Green Mother from Outer Space" was the first Oscar-nominated song to contain profanity in the lyrics and was the first to be sung by a villain (Audrey II). The film's other Academy Award nomination was for Best Visual Effects. Neither of these two Oscar nods yielded a victory.

Accolades for Little Shop of Horrors
Award	Category	Nominee(s)	Result	Ref.
Academy Awards	Best Original Song	"Mean Green Mother from Outer Space"; Music by Alan Menken; Lyrics by Howard Ashman	Nominated	
Academy Awards	Best Visual Effects	Lyle Conway, Bran Ferren, and Martin Gutteridge	Nominated	
American Comedy Awards	Funniest Actor in a Motion Picture (Leading Role)	Steve Martin	Nominated	
American Comedy Awards	Funniest Actress in a Motion Picture (Leading Role)	Ellen Greene	Nominated	
Artios Awards	Outstanding Achievement in Feature Film Casting – Comedy	Margery Simkin	Nominated	
British Academy Film Awards	Best Special Visual Effects	Bran Ferren, Martin Gutteridge, Lyle Conway, and Richard Conway	Nominated	
Golden Globe Awards	Best Motion Picture – Musical or Comedy		Nominated	
Golden Globe Awards	Best Original Score – Motion Picture	Miles Goodman	Nominated	
Hugo Awards	Best Dramatic Presentation	Frank Oz, Howard Ashman, and Charles B. Griffith	Nominated	
Saturn Awards (1986)	Best Horror Film		Nominated	
Saturn Awards (1986)	Best Writing	Howard Ashman	Nominated	
Saturn Awards (1986)	Best Costumes	Marit Allen	Nominated	
Saturn Awards (1986)	Best Music	Alan Menken	Won	
Saturn Awards (1986)	Best Special Effects	Lyle Conway	Nominated	
Saturn Awards (2012)	Best DVD or Blu-ray Special Edition Release		Won	
Writers Guild of America Awards	Best Screenplay – Based on Material from Another Medium	Howard Ashman	Nominated	

=== Home media ===
Little Shop of Horrors was the first DVD to be recalled for content. In 1998, Warner Home Video released a special edition DVD that contained approximately 23 minutes of unfinished footage from Oz's original ending, although it was in black and white and was missing some sound, visual and special effects. Producer and rights owner David Geffen was not aware of this release until it made it to the stores. Geffen said, "They put out a black-and-white, un-scored, un-dubbed video copy of the original ending that looked like shit." As a result, the studio removed it from shelves in a matter of days and replaced it with a second edition that did not contain the extra material. Geffen wanted to theatrically re-release the film with the original ending intact. Geffen also claimed to have a color copy of the original ending, while the studio had lower quality, black and white duplicates as their own color print was destroyed in a studio fire years earlier. But Geffen had not known, until after the DVD was pulled, that the studio did not know there was a colored copy of the original ending in existence.

In November 2011, Oz held a Q&A session at the Museum of the Moving Image in Astoria, Queens during a Henson-themed exhibit. During the talk, he announced that the film would be released as a new special edition with the original ending restored. Warner Bros. reconstructed and restored the ending in an alternate edit, with re-discovered color negatives of the sequence and the help of production notes from Oz and others on the film's creative team. It was released on DVD and Blu-ray on October 9, 2012, with features returning from the original DVD. It was initially subtitled as "The Intended Cut", but changed to "The Director's Cut" once Oz began to support the release. The new edit was screened at the 50th New York Film Festival in the "Masterwork" line-up on September 29, 2012, alongside titles such as Laurence Olivier's Richard III and Michael Cimino's Heaven's Gate.

== Cancelled remake ==
By 2020, a remake of the film was planned, with Taron Egerton in talks to play Seymour, Scarlett Johansson as Audrey and Billy Porter voicing Audrey II. The film was being developed by Warner Bros. Pictures with Greg Berlanti directing and producing with Marc Platt and David Geffen. Chris Evans was also in talks to play Dr. Scrivello. Matthew Robinson was to write the screenplay. By September 2022, the remake had been cancelled.

== See also ==
- List of films featuring eclipses
