= Community High School (Teaneck, New Jersey) =

Private high school in Bergen County, New Jersey, United States

Location
- 1135 Teaneck Road; Teaneck, Bergen County, New Jersey 07666; United States
- 40.892955°N 74.002136°W

Information
- Type: Private secondary
- Established: 1968
- NCES School ID: A9104313
- Principal: Evan Toth
- Faculty: 52.6 FTEs
- Grades: 9-12
- Enrollment: 232 (as of 2023–24)
- Student to teacher ratio: 4.4:1
- Campus: Urban fringe
- Colors: Red and white
- Mascot: Eagle
- Newspaper: The Eagle Eye
- Website: www.communityschoolk12nj.org/high-school.html

Community High School, located in Teaneck, in Bergen County, in the U.S. state of New Jersey, is a private high school designed for children aged 14–18. The school has been accredited by the Middle States Association of Colleges and Schools Commission on Elementary and Secondary Schools since 2006.

As of the 2023–24 school year, the school had an enrollment of 232 students and 52.6 classroom teachers (on an FTE basis), for a student–teacher ratio of 4.4:1. The school's student body was 38.8% (90) White, 30.2% (70) Black, 28.0% (65) Hispanic, 2.2% (5) Asian and 0.9% (2) two or more races.

The school is a member of the New Jersey Association of Independent Schools.

== History ==
Community High School was founded in 1968 in Demarest, New Jersey, and was a pioneer in teaching learning-disabled students. It became one of the largest programs in the region to provide for students in need of special education.

== Westwood campus and fire ==
In 1990, the school relocated to Westwood, New Jersey, and moved into a former parochial school building that was affiliated with St. Andrew's Roman Catholic church that sat next door. Most students attended on tuition paid by the state, and the school bused in students from Northern New Jersey and New York City.

Shortly before 8:30 AM on March 13, 1998, a 17-year-old student from Manhattan set a fire in a second floor bathroom, which quickly spread through the building's open attic of the building, fanned by strong winds that day. The school was not required by law to have a sprinkler system as it was less than 70 feet. All students, teachers and administrators were safely evacuated and no one was harmed, but the school's 67-year-old main building burnt to the ground and supplies and equipment inside were destroyed, though books and materials in an adjoining wing that had been added on to the original structure survived the fire. The school moved to its current location in Teaneck following the fire.

== Athletics ==
As of the 2007 school year the coach of Community High School's boys' basketball team, had worked to build a cohesive team from a group of teens who struggle with attention deficit disorder, dyslexia and social delays.

== See also ==
- Community School - Lower school for grades 1-8
