= 1984 National Society of Film Critics Awards =

Annual US film awards ceremony

19th NSFC Awards

January 3, 1985

Best Film:
Stranger Than Paradise

The 19th National Society of Film Critics Awards, given on 3 January 1985, honored the best filmmaking of 1984.

== Winners ==
=== Best Picture ===
- Stranger Than Paradise
- Runner-up: A Sunday in the Country (Un dimanche à la campagne)

=== Best Director ===
- Robert Bresson – L'Argent
- Runner-up: Bertrand Tavernier – A Sunday in the Country (Un dimanche à la campagne)

=== Best Actor ===
- Steve Martin – All of Me
- Runner-up: Albert Finney – Under the Volcano

=== Best Actress ===
- Vanessa Redgrave – The Bostonians
- Runner-up: Kathleen Turner – Romancing the Stone

=== Best Supporting Actor ===
- John Malkovich – Places in the Heart and The Killing Fields
- Runner-up: Ralph Richardson – Greystoke: The Legend of Tarzan, Lord of the Apes

=== Best Supporting Actress ===
- Melanie Griffith – Body Double
- Runner-up: Peggy Ashcroft – A Passage to India

=== Best Screenplay ===
- Lowell Ganz, Babaloo Mandel and Bruce Jay Friedman – Splash
- Runner-up: Bertrand Tavernier and Colo Tavernier – A Sunday in the Country (Un dimanche à la campagne)

=== Best Cinematography ===
- Chris Menges – Comfort and Joy and The Killing Fields

=== Best Documentary ===
- Stop Making Sense
