= 1984 New York Film Critics Circle Awards =

50th New York Film Critics Circle Awards

50th New York Film Critics Circle Awards

January 27, 1985

Best Film:
A Passage to India

The 50th New York Film Critics Circle Awards honored the best filmmaking of 1984. The winners were announced on 18 December 1984 and the awards were given on 27 January 1985.

== Winners ==
- Best Actor:
  - Steve Martin - All of Me
  - Runner-up: Albert Finney - Under the Volcano
- Best Actress:
  - Peggy Ashcroft - A Passage to India
  - Runner-up: Vanessa Redgrave - The Bostonians
- Best Cinematography:
  - Chris Menges - The Killing Fields
- Best Director:
  - David Lean - A Passage to India
  - Runner-up: Bertrand Tavernier - A Sunday in the Country (Un dimanche à la campagne)
- Best Documentary:
  - The Times of Harvey Milk
- Best Film:
  - A Passage to India
  - Runner-up: The Killing Fields
- Best Foreign Language Film:
  - A Sunday in the Country (Un dimanche à la campagne) • France
- Best Screenplay:
  - Robert Benton - Places in the Heart
- Best Supporting Actor:
  - Ralph Richardson - Greystoke: The Legend of Tarzan, Lord of the Apes
  - Runner-up: John Malkovich - Places in the Heart
- Best Supporting Actress:
  - Christine Lahti - Swing Shift
  - Runner-up: Melanie Griffith - Body Double
