= Under the Volcano (1984 film) =

Adaptation of Malcolm Lowry novel, directed by John Huston

- Theatrical release poster
- Directed by: John Huston
- Screenplay by: Guy Gallo
- Based on: Under the Volcano (1947 novel) by Malcolm Lowry
- Produced by: Moritz Borman; Wieland Schulz-Keil
- Starring: Albert Finney; Jacqueline Bisset; Anthony Andrews
- Cinematography: Gabriel Figueroa
- Edited by: Roberto Silvi
- Music by: Alex North
- Production company: Ithaca Enterprises; Conacite Uno
- Distributed by: Universal Pictures (U.S.); 20th Century Fox (Int.)
- Release dates: May 18, 1984 (Cannes); June 12, 1984 (U.S.)
- Running time: 112 minutes
- Countries: United States; Mexico
- Languages: English; Spanish
- Box office: $2,556,800

Under the Volcano is a 1984 drama film directed by John Huston, based on Malcolm Lowry's semi-autobiographical 1947 novel. It stars Albert Finney, Jacqueline Bisset, and Anthony Andrews, and features Ignacio López Tarso, Katy Jurado, and Emilio Fernández in supporting roles. The film follows 24 hours in the life of Geoffrey Firmin (Finney), an alcoholic British former consul in the small Mexican town of Quauhnahuac on the Day of the Dead in 1938.

An international co-production between the United States and Mexico, the film premiered at the 1984 Cannes Film Festival, where it was nominated for the Palme d'Or. It received Oscar nominations for Best Actor in a Leading Role (for Finney) and Best Original Score, along with Golden Globe nominations for Best Actor (Finney) and Best Supporting Actress (Bisset).

== Plot ==
On the Day of the Dead in 1938, Geoffrey Firmin, an alcoholic British consul to Mexico, despondent from the yearlong absence of his wife Yvonne, wanders the streets of Quauhnahuac in a stupor, observing the festivities and crashing a Red Cross charity ball. He searches for letters she sent him, unable to remember where he might have left them.

In the morning, Yvonne returns to attempt reconciliation and they are joined by Geoffrey's half-brother, Hugh, who has recently returned from the Spanish Civil War. Hugh is a journalist, investigating a possible plot by the Germans. Both Yvonne and Hugh are alarmed at how far Geoffrey's alcoholism has progressed, to the point that he must drink or suffer delirium tremens. The trio decides to visit by bus one of the twin volcanoes that rise above the town, Popocatépetl. They stop for brunch along the way at a restaurant that overlooks a bullfighting ring. At one point, Hugh jumps in and successfully uses a Muleta (the red capes) with a bull charging him. The crowd celebrates his bravado. Geoffrey finally says aloud the secret they have all avoided discussing, an affair between Yvonne and Hugh.

Geoffrey boards the bus to return, yet gets off at cantina he had mentioned earlier as a place where he might have misplaced the letters. It is also a bordello and upon seeing him, the proprietor/pimp reveals he indeed has the missing letters from Yvonne.

Breaking his earlier vow against mezcal, Geoffrey becomes increasingly drunk and is propositioned by the pimp. Yvonne and Hugh arrive as he is taken into one of the rooms by a prostitute, and Yvonne flees the cantina with Hugh in tow, heartbroken by the encounter. Completely unaware, the consul emerges from the room and is extorted by the pimp and local police chiefs, who accuse him of not paying for drinks or the prostitute, and trying to steal a horse. The men push Geoffrey outside and shoot him dead in the street. The gunshots startle the horse outside, which runs off into the night, trampling Yvonne as she tries to return to the cantina.

== Cast ==
- Albert Finney as Geoffrey Firmin
- Jacqueline Bisset as Yvonne Firmin
- Anthony Andrews as Hugh Firmin
- Ignacio López Tarso as Dr. Arturo Díaz Vigil
- Katy Jurado as Señora Gregoria
- James Villiers as Brit
- Dawson Bray as Quincey
- Carlos Riquelme as Bustamante
- José René Ruiz as the Dwarf
- Emilio Fernández as Diosdado Brell
- Jim McCarthy as Gringo in Brothel
- Hugo Stiglitz as Sinarquista
- Günter Meisner as Herr Krausberg
- Araceli Ladewuen Castelun as Maria
- Eleazar Garcia Jr., Salvador Sánchez, and Sergio Calderón as the Chiefs

== Production ==
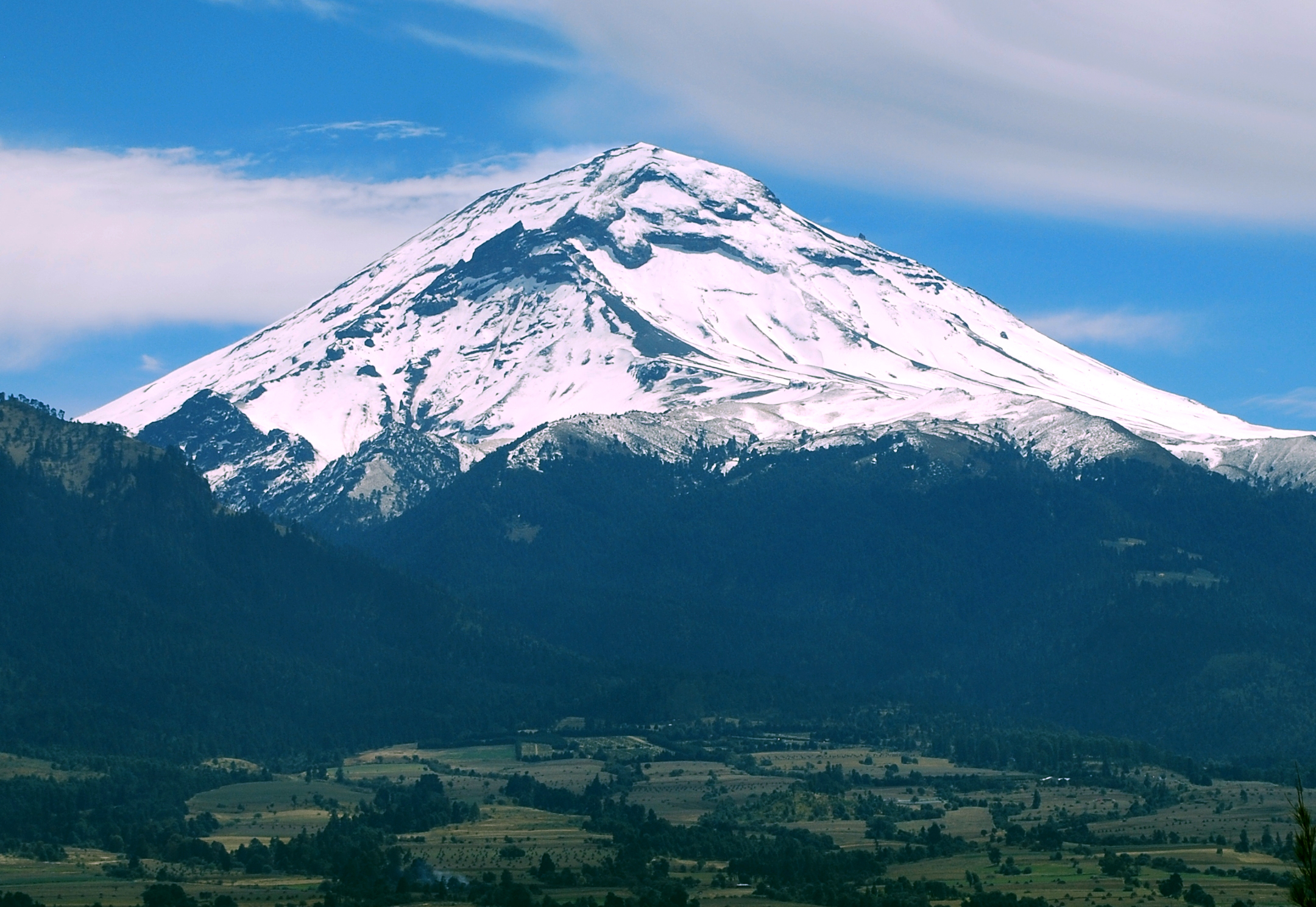
Popocatépetl, the titular volcano.

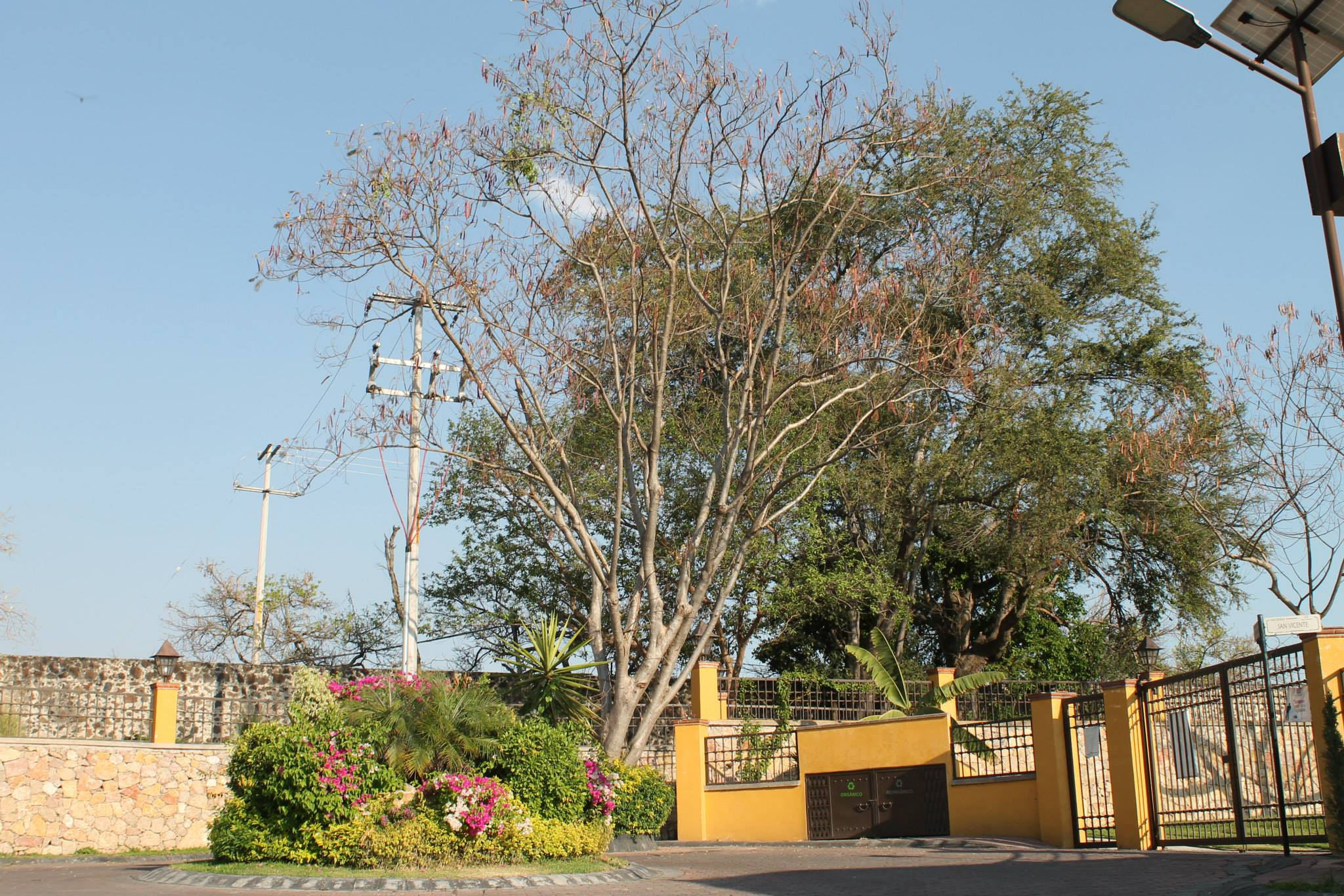
Yautepec de Zaragoza.

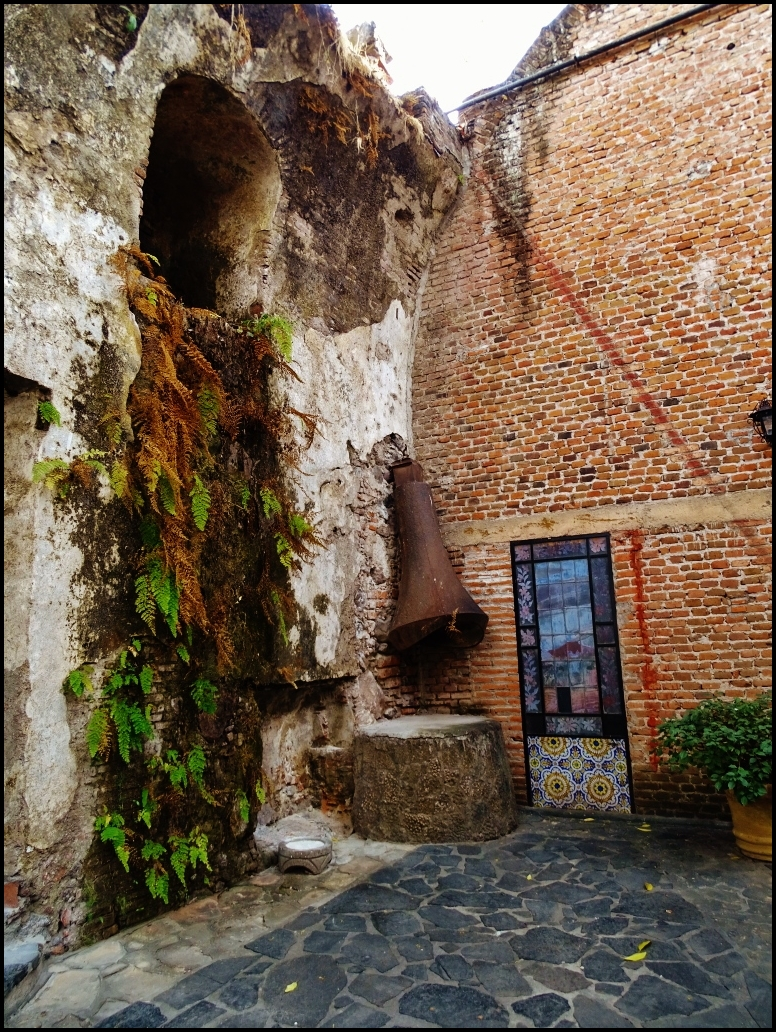
San José de Vista Hermosa Hacienda.

=== Development ===
In the late 1950s, Under the Volcano author Malcolm Lowry adapted his novel into a screenplay and attempted to interest Metro-Goldwyn-Mayer to produce it after being hired to adapt F. Scott Fitzgerald's Tender Is the Night. The studio passed and Lowry died in 1957. Actor Zachary Scott optioned the novel in 1962, but after he died his widow sold the rights to brothers Robert and Raymond Hakim, who were later sued by the Lowry estate for withholding creative consultation.

=== Casting ===
Guy Gallo, a novice playwright who had written two academic papers on Malcolm Lowry at Yale University, wrote the screenplay.

Albert Finney was cast in the lead role of Geoffrey Firmin, Jacqueline Bisset as his wife Yvonne, and Anthony Andrews as his half-brother Hugh. Firmin's friend Dr. Arturo Díaz Vigil was played by Ignacio López Tarso, an actor lesser known to English-speaking audiences but highly recognized by Mexican ones as one of the top stars of the Golden Age of Mexican cinema. The supporting cast includes several prominent Mexican filmmaking personalities, including director-actor Emilio Fernández, cult film star Hugo Stiglitz, and actress Katy Jurado.

=== Filming ===
Principal photography began on August 8, 1983, in the village of Yautepec de Zaragoza, a short car ride from Cuernavaca, which was selected due to its 18th-century architecture. The film was shot mostly in-sequence to aid Finney's performance.

Sequences were filmed at Cocoyoc and San José de Vista Hermosa Hacienda. The only purpose-built set for the film was the "El Farolito" brothel (the real location was too dilapidated), which was constructed on the outskirts of Metepec.

== Release ==
The film was entered into the 1984 Cannes Film Festival, where it was nominated for the Palme d'Or.

== Reception ==
=== Critical response ===
Upon general release, it received generally positive reviews from critics. Reviewing in The New York Times, Janet Maslin especially praised Finney's performance. (Note: The part of Geoffrey Firmin is believed to have been semi-autobiographical, depicting Malcolm Lowry himself. Lowry's first wife, Jan Gabrial, found Albert Finney's portrayal so convincing that she said of him "...it was exactly Malcolm as I knew him...")

On the review aggregator website Rotten Tomatoes, 74% of 19 critics' reviews are positive. On Metacritic, the film has a weighted average score of 70 out of 100 based on 14 critics, which the site labels as "generally favorable" reviews.

=== Awards and nominations ===
Institution	Category	Nominee(s)	Result	Ref.
Academy Awards	Best Actor	Albert Finney	Nominated	
Academy Awards	Best Original Score	Alex North	Nominated	
Cannes Film Festival	Palme d'Or	John Huston	Nominated	
Golden Globe Awards	Best Actor in a Motion Picture – Drama	Albert Finney	Nominated	
Golden Globe Awards	Best Supporting Actress – Motion Picture	Jacqueline Bisset	Nominated	
London Film Critics' Circle Awards	Actor of the Year	Albert Finney	Won	
Los Angeles Film Critics Association Awards	Best Actor	Albert Finney	Won (Note: Tied with F. Murray Abraham for Amadeus.)	
National Board of Review Awards	Top Ten Films		10th Place	
National Society of Film Critics Awards	Best Actor	Albert Finney	Runner-up	
New York Film Critics Circle Awards	Best Actor	Albert Finney	Runner-up	

== Related works ==
Huston's drama has sometimes been shown in tandem with an earlier documentary film: Volcano: An Inquiry into the Life and Death of Malcolm Lowry (1976) is a National Film Board of Canada feature-length documentary produced by Donald Brittain and Robert A. Duncan and directed by Brittain and John Kramer. It opens with the inquest into Lowry's "death by misadventure," and then moves back in time to trace the writer's life. Selections from Lowry's novel are read by Richard Burton amid images shot in Mexico, the United States, Canada and England.

There are two documentaries about the making of the Huston film: Gary Conklin's 56-minute Notes from Under the Volcano and the 82-minute Observations Under the Volcano, directed by Christian Blackwood.

== See also ==
- List of American films of 1984
