= A Passage to India (film) =

1984 drama film directed by David Lean

- Original theatrical poster
- Directed by: David Lean
- Screenplay by: David Lean
- Based on: A Passage to India (1924) by: E. M. Forster; A Passage to India (1960); Santha Rama Rau
- Produced by: John Brabourne; Richard Goodwin
- Starring: Peggy Ashcroft; Judy Davis; James Fox; Alec Guinness; Nigel Havers; Victor Banerjee
- Cinematography: Ernest Day
- Edited by: David Lean
- Music by: Maurice Jarre
- Production companies: Thorn EMI Screen Entertainment; Home Box Office, Inc.
- Distributed by: Columbia-EMI-Warner Distributors (United Kingdom); Columbia Pictures (United States and Canada)
- Release date: 14 December 1984
- Running time: 163 minutes
- Countries: United Kingdom; United States
- Language: English
- Budget: £17 million or $14.5 million
- Box office: $40 million (est.)

A Passage to India is a 1984 epic period drama film written, directed and edited by David Lean. The screenplay is based on the 1924 novel of the same name by E. M. Forster and the 1960 play adaptation by Santha Rama Rau. The film stars Peggy Ashcroft, Judy Davis, James Fox, Alec Guinness, Nigel Havers, and Victor Banerjee.

Set in the 1920s, in the British Raj, the film follows the interactions of Dr. Aziz, Mrs. Moore, Adela Quested, Ronny Heaslop, and Richard Fielding in the fictional city of Chandrapore, which is split between the British elite and the native underclass. However, their relationships become strained due to cultural tensions and personal misunderstandings.

This was Lean's final film and marked his return to directing after a 14-year hiatus since Ryan's Daughter (1970). Upon its release, A Passage to India was met with widespread critical acclaim, with some praising it as Lean's finest since Lawrence of Arabia. The film received 11 nominations at the 57th Academy Awards, including Best Picture, Best Director, and Best Actress for Davis. It won Best Supporting Actress for Ashcroft, making her, at 77, the oldest actress to win the award, and Best Original Score for Maurice Jarre, his third award in that category.

== Plot ==
Adela Quested is sailing from England to British-ruled India with Mrs. Moore, the mother of her intended bridegroom, Ronny Heaslop, Mrs. Moore's son from her first marriage. Ronny is the City magistrate in Chandrapore, and Adela intends to see if she can make a go of it.

The ladies are disappointed to find that the British community has separated themselves from, and alienated, the native Indian population and culture with a growing Indian independence movement in the 1920s. They are encouraged when the local school superintendent, Richard Fielding, introduces them to the eccentric elderly Hindu Brahmin scholar Professor Narayan Godbole. Mrs. Moore meets, by chance, another Indian, Dr Aziz Ahmed, a local doctor and widower who is surprised by her kindness and lack of prejudice. Anxious to please Mrs. Moore and Adela, Aziz offers to host an excursion to the local Marabar Caves, and plans it with the help of his friends. In the meanwhile, Adela explores the foreign surroundings, yearning to see something of the "real India" instead of staying within the cushioned and isolated British community in Chandrapore. At a garden party intended to bridge the gap between the British and native Indian communities, Mrs. Moore berates her son Ronny for adopting the common British attitude of alienating Indians, debating the role of British rule in India.

When the garden party initially explores one of the caves, Mrs. Moore suffers from claustrophobia and the noise from the large entourage echoes exponentially inside the caves, showing that the size of the party should be limited. Mrs. Moore encourages Adela and Aziz to continue their exploration of the caves alone with one guide, while she goes to get some rest.

Adela and Aziz reach the caves at a higher elevation some distance from the group and, before entering, Aziz steps away to smoke a cigarette. Adela enters one of the caves on her own, lights a match, and inexplicably begins to cry. Aziz returns to find Adela has disappeared. Shortly afterwards, he sees her running headlong down the hill, disheveled. She is picked up by the doctor's wife, Mrs. Callendar, and taken to the Callendars' home. Adela is bleeding from cactus needles and delirious. Dr. Callendar medicates Adela with a hypodermic syringe.

Upon his return to Chandrapore, Aziz is startled to find himself accused of attempting to rape Adela inside the caves and is jailed awaiting trial. The incident becomes a cause célèbre. Mr. Fielding, who has befriended Aziz, insists he is innocent. Mrs. Moore also firmly believes Aziz did not commit any offence and departs India for England. Seemingly enjoying her passage at sea, Mrs. Moore suddenly suffers an apparent heart attack and dies.

In court, Adela is questioned by the prosecutor Mr. McBryde, who is stunned when Adela replies that Aziz never entered the cave, where the supposed attempted rape took place. It becomes clear to Adela that her earlier signed accusation of attempted rape was false, so she breaks down and recants. Aziz is freed and his innocence celebrated by the local population, though he begins to deeply resent the British for having been humiliated at court. Adela is abandoned to her own devices by the British except for Mr. Fielding, who assists her to safety at the college. She plans to return to England at the earliest moment. Aziz finds a new job in another Indian state away from Chandrapore; he opens a clinic in the lake area near Srinagar, Kashmir.

Meanwhile, through Adela, Fielding has married Stella Moore, Mrs. Moore's daughter from her second marriage. Aziz eventually reconciles with Fielding, and Aziz writes to Adela asking her to forgive him for taking so long to come to appreciate the courage she exercised when she withdrew her accusation in court.

== Cast ==
- Judy Davis as Adela Quested
- Victor Banerjee as Dr. Aziz Ahmed
- Peggy Ashcroft as Mrs. Moore
- James Fox as Richard Fielding
- Alec Guinness as Professor Narayan Godbole
- Nigel Havers as Ronny Heaslop
- Richard Wilson as Collector Turton
- Antonia Pemberton as Mrs. Turton
- Michael Culver as Major McBryde
- Art Malik as Ali
- Saeed Jaffrey as Advocate Hamidullah
- Clive Swift as Major Callendar
- Ann Firbank as Mrs. Callendar
- Roshan Seth as Advocate Amrit Rao
- Sandra Hotz as Stella Moore-Fielding
- Rashid Karapiet as Das
- H. S. Krishnamurthy as Hassan
- Ishaq Bux as Selim
- Moti Makan as Guide
- Mohammed Ashiq as Haq
- Z. H. Khan as Dr. Panna Lal
- Ashok Mandanna as Anthony
- Dina Pathak as Begum Hamidullah
- Adam Blackwood as Mr. Hadley

== Production ==
=== Background ===
E. M. Forster began writing A Passage to India during a stay in India from late 1912 to early 1913 (he was drawn there by a young Indian Muslim, Syed Ross Masood, whom he had tutored in Latin), completing it only after he returned to India as secretary to a maharajah in 1921. The novel was published on 4 June 1924.

A Passage to India deals with the delicate balance between the English and the Indians during the British Raj. The question of what actually happened in the caves remains unanswered in the novel. A Passage to India sold well and was widely praised in literary circles. It is generally regarded as Forster's best novel, quickly becoming a classic of English literature.

Over many years several film directors were interested in adapting the novel to the big screen, but Forster, who was criticised when the novel was published, rejected every offer for the film rights, believing that any film of his novel would be a travesty. He feared that whoever made it would come down on the side of the English or the Indians, and he wanted balance. However he did allow Indian author Santha Rama Rau to adapt it for the theatre in 1957.

David Lean had read the novel and saw the play in London in 1960, and, impressed, attempted to purchase the rights at that time, but Forster, who rejected Santha Rama Rau's suggestion to allow Indian film director Satyajit Ray to make a film, said no.

Following Forster's death in 1970, the governing board of fellows of King's College at Cambridge inherited the rights to his books. However, Donald Parry, his executor, turned down all approaches, including those of Joseph Losey, Ismail Merchant and James Ivory, and Waris Hussein, who after adapting Santha Rama Rau's play for the BBC in the 1960s now wanted to make a feature film. Ten years later, when Professor Bernard Williams, a film enthusiast, became chief executor, the rights for a film adaptation became available.

=== Development ===
Producer John Brabourne, also known as John Knatchbull, 7th Baron Brabourne, whose father had been Governor of Bombay and later Governor of Bengal, and who was married to the daughter of Lord Mountbatten, the last viceroy, had sought the film rights for twenty years. He and his business partner, Richard Goodwin, had produced Franco Zeffirelli's Romeo and Juliet (1968) and films based on Agatha Christie's mysteries, including the 1974 Murder on the Orient Express. In March 1981, Brabourne and Goodwin obtained the rights to make a film adaptation of A Passage to India. The contract stipulated that Santha Rama Rau write the screenplay and it reserved the right to approve the director.

"Forster gave us a verbal go-ahead", remembered Goodwin later, "but my partner (John Brabourne) and I never got it in writing. So it was another 10 years before the Forster estate arranged the sale of film rights". Lindsay Anderson later claimed he turned down a chance to direct the film of the novel.

Brabourne, an admirer of the film Doctor Zhivago, wanted David Lean to direct the film. Lean was ready to break his 14-year hiatus from filmmaking following mostly negative reviews received for Ryan's Daughter in 1970. Since that time, Lean had fought to make a two-part epic telling the true story of the Mutiny on the Bounty from the book by Isak Dinesen (which Sydney Pollack ultimately directed in 1985), but could not obtain the estimated $50 million financing. He had, however, also given some thought to doing a film adaptation of Out of Africa, and by September 1981, Lean was approved as director and Santha Rama Rau completed a draft of the script.

=== Writing ===
The contract stipulated that Santha Rama Rau would write the screenplay. She had met with E. M. Forster, had successfully adapted A Passage to India as a play, and had been charged by the author with preserving the spirit of the novel. However, Lean was determined to exercise input in the writing process. He met with Rau in Berkeley, Gloucestershire, and over ten days they talked about the novel and discussed the script.

The initial script pleased neither the producer, John Brabourne, nor Lean. They considered it too worldly and literary, the work of a playwright, and unsuitable for a film. Most of the scenes took place indoors and in offices while Lean had in mind to film outdoors as much as possible. With India in the title of the film, he reasoned, audiences would expect to see many scenes filmed of the Indian landscape. Lean commented: "We are blessed with a fine movie title, A Passage to India. But it has built in danger; it holds out such a promise. The very mention of India conjures up high expectations. It has sweep and size and is very romantic". Lean did not want to present a poor man's pre-independence India when for the same amount of money he could show the country's visual richness.

During 1982, Lean worked on the script. He spent six months in New Delhi, to have a close feeling for the country while writing. As he could not stay longer for tax reasons, he then moved to Zurich for three months, finishing it there. Following the same method he had employed adapting Charles Dickens's Great Expectations, he went through Rau's original script and his copy of the novel, picking out the episodes that were indispensable and passing over those that did not advance the plot. Lean typed out the whole screenplay himself, correcting it as he went along, following the principle that scripts are not written, but rewritten.

=== Casting ===
The director cast Australian actress Judy Davis, then 28, as the naive Miss Quested after a two-hour meeting. When Davis gave her interpretation of what happened in the caves — "She can't cope with her own sexuality, she just freaks out" — Lean said that the part was hers. Davis had garnered international attention in Gillian Armstrong's My Brilliant Career (1979) and had appeared in A Woman Called Golda (1982) as a young Golda Meir.

Lean wanted Celia Johnson, star of Brief Encounter, to play Mrs Moore, but she turned down the part and died before the film was released. The director then offered the part to Peggy Ashcroft, a stage actress who had appeared in films only sporadically. She was not enthusiastic when Lean asked her to be Mrs Moore. "Mr Lean, I'm 75 years old", she protested. "So am I", he replied. Although she had recently worked in India on the TV miniseries The Jewel in the Crown, she said, "I thought, 'Oh dear, I really don't want to do it', but it's very difficult to turn down a Lean film". In addition to Ashcroft, actor Art Malik also appeared in "The Jewel in the Crown".

Satyajit Ray, who had hoped to direct his adaptation of A Passage to India, recommended 38-year-old Bengali actor Victor Banerjee for the role of Dr Aziz. The character required a combination of foolishness, bravery, honour and anger. After some hesitation, Lean cast Banerjee, but the director had to overcome the restrictions of British Equity to employ an Indian actor. Lean got his way, and the casting made headlines in India. "It was a matter of national pride that an Indian was cast instead of an Asian from England" observed Banerjee.

Peter O'Toole was Lean's first choice to play Fielding. The role eventually went to James Fox. Despite having quarrelled with Lean in the 1960s about a proposed film about Gandhi that ultimately was scrapped, Alec Guinness agreed to portray Professor Godbole. The relationship between the two men deteriorated during filming, and when Guinness learned that much of his performance was left on the cutting room floor due to time constraints, he saw it as a personal affront. Guinness would not speak to Lean for years afterwards, patching things up only in the last years of Lean's life. Nigel Hawthorne was cast as Turton but fell ill and was replaced on-set by Richard Wilson.

=== Financing ===
Financing the film was difficult. EMI provided some initial money, but Lean paid his own expenses scouting locations and writing the screenplay. Eventually the budget was raised from EMI, Columbia and Home Box Office.

In December 1984, Thorn EMI offered investors the chance to invest in several films by issuing £36 million worth of shares. The films were A Passage to India (1984), Morons from Outer Space, Dreamchild, Wild Geese II and The Holcroft Covenant (all 1985). Passage to India would be regarded as one of EMI's best later movies.

=== Filming ===
Filming took place from November 1983 to June 1984.

The Marabar Caves are based on the Barabar Caves, some 35 km north of Gaya, in Bihar. Lean visited the caves during pre-production, and found them flat and unattractive; concerns about bandits were also prevalent. Instead he used the hills of Savandurga and Ramadevarabetta some tens of kilometers from Bangalore, where much of the principal filming took place; small cave entrances were carved out by the production company. Other scenes were filmed in Ramanagaram (Karnataka) and Udhagamandalam (Tamil Nadu) and in Srinagar (Jammu and Kashmir). Some interiors were shot at Shepperton Studios in Surrey and in Bangalore Palace.

=== Costume ===
Costume designer Judy Moorcroft was brought on to design the period costumes for the film, along with supervisor Rosemary Burrows, wardrobe master Keith Morton and assistant Sally Turner. David Lean and Judy Davis disagreed about the characterisation of Adela, which caused problems for the costume designer - dresses that had been agreed between Moorcroft and Davis were ‘too frumpy’ according to Lean, and had to be changed. Nevertheless, Moorcroft received her second Academy Award nomination for the film.

=== Music ===
The film's score was composed by longtime Lean collaborator Maurice Jarre. According to Jarre, the director told him, "Maurice, I want you to write music right from your groin for this very long scene in the cave. This isn't a story of India, it's a story of a woman. I want you to write music that evokes awakening sexuality".

Jarre wrote 45 minutes of music in two and a half weeks. He said, "David talks to me in images. A film artist never asks for an oboe to cover up a bad scene; a film artist doesn't think of music as medicine for a sick movie. David talks to me as he would talk to an actor."

== Reception ==
=== Critical response ===
Lean's final film received widespread critical acclaim, and became a critics' favourite of 1984. Vincent Canby of The New York Times called it "[Lean's] best work since The Bridge on the River Kwai and Lawrence of Arabia and perhaps his most humane and moving film since Brief Encounter. Though vast in physical scale and set against a tumultuous Indian background, it is also intimate, funny and moving in the manner of a film maker completely in control of his material ... Though [Lean] has made A Passage to India both less mysterious and more cryptic than the book, the film remains a wonderfully provocative tale, full of vivid characters, all played to near perfection."

Roger Ebert of the Chicago Sun-Times observed that "Forster's novel is one of the literary landmarks of this century, and now David Lean has made it into one of the greatest screen adaptations I have ever seen ... [He] is a meticulous craftsman, famous for going to any length to make every shot look just the way he thinks it should. His actors here are encouraged to give sound, thoughtful, unflashy performances ... and his screenplay is a model of clarity."

Variety called the film "impeccably faithful, beautifully played and occasionally languorous" and added, "Lean has succeeded to a great degree in the tricky task of capturing Forster's finely edged tone of rational bemusement and irony."

Time Out London thought the film was "a curiously modest affair, abandoning the tub-thumping epic style of Lean's late years. While adhering to perhaps 80 per cent of the book's incident, Lean veers very wide of the mark over E.M. Forster's hatred of the British presence in India, and comes down much more heavily on the side of the British. But he has assembled his strongest cast in years ... And once again Lean indulges his taste for scenery, demonstrating an ability with sheer scale which has virtually eluded British cinema throughout its history. Not for literary purists, but if you like your entertainment well tailored, then feel the quality and the width."

Channel 4 said, "Lean was always preoccupied with landscapes and obsessed with the perfect shot – but here his canvas is way smaller than in Lawrence of Arabia, for instance ... Still, while the storytelling is rather toothless, A Passage to India is certainly well worth watching for fans of the director's epic style."

On Rotten Tomatoes, A Passage to India holds a rating of 77% from 30 critics, with an average rating of 7.20/10. The website's critical consensus reads, "A Passage to India is a visually striking exploration of colonialism and prejudice, although it doesn't achieve the thematic breadth of director David Lean's finest work." The film is assigned an average score of 78 out of 100 on Metacritic, based on 14 critic reviews, indicating "generally favorable" reviews.

=== Box office ===
Market(s)	Release	Ticket sales	Box office gross revenue	Ref
United States / Canada	1984	7,700,000	$27,187,653	
United Kingdom	1985	2,528,729 (est.)	£4,313,000 ($5,536,585)	
France	1985	984,724	$2,668,602 (est.)	(Note: See Box office § Average ticket price.)
Germany	1985	713,303	€3,136,849 ($2,716,217)	
Spain / Sweden	1985	317,100	$719,817 (est.)	
Italy	1985	285,646	$648,416 (est.)	
South Korea	1986	135,032	₩472,612,000 ($536,176) (est.)	
Netherlands / Iceland / Portugal	2007	217		
New Zealand	2011		US$13,591	
Total		12,664,751+ (est.)	$40,027,057+ (est.)	

=== Awards and honors ===
Award	Category	Nominee(s)	Result	Ref.
Academy Awards	Best Picture	John Brabourne and Richard Goodwin	Nominated	
Academy Awards	Best Director	David Lean	Nominated	
Academy Awards	Best Actress	Judy Davis	Nominated	
Academy Awards	Best Supporting Actress	Peggy Ashcroft	Won	
Academy Awards	Best Screenplay – Based on Material from Another Medium	David Lean	Nominated	
Academy Awards	Best Art Direction	Art Direction: John Box and Leslie Tomkins; Set Decoration: Hugh Scaife	Nominated	
Academy Awards	Best Cinematography	Ernest Day	Nominated	
Academy Awards	Best Costume Design	Judy Moorcroft	Nominated	
Academy Awards	Best Film Editing	David Lean	Nominated	
Academy Awards	Best Original Score	Maurice Jarre	Won	
Academy Awards	Best Sound	Graham V. Hartstone, Nicolas Le Messurier, Michael A. Carter, and John W. Mitchell	Nominated	
American Film Institute	AFI's 100 Years of Film Scores	Maurice Jarre	Nominated	
Boston Society of Film Critics Awards	Best Actress	Judy Davis	Won	
Boston Society of Film Critics Awards	Best Supporting Actress	Peggy Ashcroft	Won	
British Academy Film Awards	Best Film	John Knatchbull, Richard Goodwin, and David Lean	Nominated	
British Academy Film Awards	Best Actor in a Leading Role	Victor Banerjee	Nominated	
British Academy Film Awards	Best Actress in a Leading Role	Peggy Ashcroft	Won	
British Academy Film Awards	Best Actor in a Supporting Role	James Fox	Nominated	
British Academy Film Awards	Best Adapted Screenplay	David Lean	Nominated	
British Academy Film Awards	Best Cinematography	Ernest Day	Nominated	
British Academy Film Awards	Best Costume Design	Judy Moorcroft	Nominated	
British Academy Film Awards	Best Production Design	John Box	Nominated	
British Academy Film Awards	Best Score for a Film	Maurice Jarre	Nominated	
British Society of Cinematographers Awards	Best Cinematography in a Theatrical Feature Film	Ernest Day	Nominated	
Directors Guild of America Awards	Outstanding Directorial Achievement in Motion Pictures	David Lean	Nominated	
Evening Standard British Film Awards	Best Actor	Victor Banerjee	Won	
Golden Globe Awards	Best Foreign Film		Won	
Golden Globe Awards	Best Supporting Actress – Motion Picture	Peggy Ashcroft	Won	
Golden Globe Awards	Best Director – Motion Picture	David Lean	Nominated	
Golden Globe Awards	Best Screenplay – Motion Picture	David Lean	Nominated	
Golden Globe Awards	Best Original Score – Motion Picture	Maurice Jarre	Won	
Grammy Awards	Best Album of Original Score Written for a Motion Picture or Television Special	Maurice Jarre	Nominated	
Japan Academy Film Prize	Outstanding Foreign Language Film		Nominated	
Kansas City Film Critics Circle Awards	Best Film		Won	
Kansas City Film Critics Circle Awards	Best Director	David Lean	Won	
Kansas City Film Critics Circle Awards	Best Supporting Actress	Peggy Ashcroft	Won	
Los Angeles Film Critics Association Awards	Best Supporting Actress	Peggy Ashcroft	Won	
National Board of Review Awards	Best Film		Won	
National Board of Review Awards	Top Ten Films		Won	
National Board of Review Awards	Best Director	David Lean	Won	
National Board of Review Awards	Best Actor	Victor Banerjee	Won	
National Board of Review Awards	Best Actress	Peggy Ashcroft	Won	
National Society of Film Critics Awards	Best Director	David Lean	Nominated	
National Society of Film Critics Awards	Best Supporting Actress	Peggy Ashcroft	Nominated	
New York Film Critics Circle Awards	Best Film		Won	
New York Film Critics Circle Awards	Best Director	David Lean	Won	
New York Film Critics Circle Awards	Best Actress	Peggy Ashcroft	Won	
Writers Guild of America Awards	Best Screenplay – Based on Material from Another Medium	David Lean	Nominated	

== Home video ==
Sony Pictures Home Entertainment released the first DVD on 20 March 2001. It was in anamorphic widescreen format with audio tracks and subtitles in English, French, and Spanish. Bonus features included Reflections of David Lean, an interview with the screenwriter/director, cast biographies, and production notes.

On 9 September 2003, Columbia Pictures released the box set The David Lean Collection, which included Lawrence of Arabia, The Bridge on the River Kwai, and A Passage to India.

On 15 April 2008, Sony released A Passage To India (2-Disc Collector's Edition). In addition to Reflections of David Lean from the 2001 release, bonus features included commentary with producer Richard Goodwin; E.M. Forster: A Profile of an Author, covering some of the main themes of the original book; An Epic Takes Shape, in which cast and crew members discuss the evolution of the film; An Indian Affair, detailing the primary production period; Only Connect: A Vision of India, detailing the final days of shooting at Shepperton Studios and the post-production period; Casting a Classic, in which casting director Priscilla John discusses the challenges of bringing characters from the book to life; and David Lean: Shooting with the Master, a profile of the director. On 15 April 2008, Sony released a Blu-ray HD Collector's Edition with a restored print and new digital mastering.

== See also ==
- List of Asian historical drama films
