= Places in the Heart =

1984 film by Robert Benton

- Theatrical film poster
- Directed by: Robert Benton
- Written by: Robert Benton
- Produced by: Arlene Donovan
- Starring: Sally Field; Lindsay Crouse; Ed Harris; Amy Madigan; John Malkovich; Danny Glover
- Cinematography: Néstor Almendros
- Edited by: Carol Littleton
- Music by: John Kander
- Color process: Technicolor
- Production company: Delphi II Productions
- Distributed by: Tri-Star Pictures
- Release date: September 21, 1984
- Running time: 111 minutes
- Country: United States
- Language: English
- Budget: $9.5 million
- Box office: $34.9 million

Places in the Heart is a 1984 American drama film written and directed by Robert Benton. Set in 1930s Texas during the Great Depression, the film stars Sally Field as a recently widowed woman who struggles to save her farm with the help of a blind lodger and a black laborer. The cast also includes John Malkovich, Lindsay Crouse, Ed Harris, Amy Madigan, Danny Glover, and Terry O'Quinn.

The film premiered at the 35th Berlin International Film Festival, where Benton won the Silver Bear for Best Director. Released theatrically by Tri-Star Pictures on September 21, 1984, it was both a critical and commercial success, earning $34.9 million on a $9.5 million budget. Places in the Heart received seven Academy Award nominations, including Best Picture, and won two: Best Actress for Field and Best Original Screenplay for Benton. The film won the People's Choice Award at the 9th Toronto International Film Festival.

== Plot ==
In 1935, during the Great Depression, the quiet town of Waxahachie, Texas is shaken when Sheriff Royce Spalding is accidentally shot and killed by a drunk Black teenager, Wylie, who believes his revolver is empty. That same day, a white lynch mob brutally murders Wylie and drags his body through town, leaving it hanging from a tree. Both Royce and Wylie are buried on the same day.

Royce's widow, Edna Spalding, is left to raise their two young children, Frank and Possum, on a struggling cotton farm. Her sister Margaret helps with the funeral, but Edna quickly finds herself facing financial ruin. The local banker, Albert Denby, tells her to sell the farm, but she refuses.

That night, a Black drifter named Moses "Moze" Hadner arrives at Edna's door asking for work. He claims to know how to farm cotton and offers to help her. She feeds him but sends him away. The next morning, she finds him chopping wood in her yard. She feeds him again, but Moze later steals silverware and is caught. When the police bring him back, Edna decides not to press charges and instead hires him officially.

Edna's troubles mount when Denby insists she take in his blind brother-in-law, Will, a bitter World War I veteran, as a boarder. Will resents his new situation but gradually forms a bond with Edna's children, especially after rescuing Possum during a tornado that devastates part of the town.

Meanwhile, Margaret's marriage begins to fall apart as her husband Wayne carries on an affair with Viola Kelsey, a married schoolteacher. After the tornado, Margaret discovers the truth and Wayne confesses the affair, and she tells him she won't forgive him this time.

As cotton prices continue to fall, Edna realizes she can't meet the next mortgage payment. She learns of a $100 prize awarded to the first farmer in Ellis County to bring in a bale of cotton for the season. With Moze's guidance, Edna assembles a small team of pickers and races to harvest and sell the crop. Moze teaches her how to negotiate fairly with the buyer, and their gamble pays off—they win the prize and sell the cotton at a good price, enough to save the farm.

Their success is short-lived. That night, Moze is attacked by the Ku Klux Klan. Will, hearing the assault and recognizing the attackers by voice, intervenes with Royce's old revolver. He stops the beating, and the men flee. Moze knows that his life is in danger and staying will only bring trouble to Edna and her children. Before leaving, he gives her a handkerchief that belonged to his mother.

The film closes with a dreamlike church scene. As a choir sings and 1 Corinthians 13 is read aloud, characters from earlier in the story—living and dead—appear among the pews, taking part in Holy Communion. Margaret takes Wayne's hand in silent reconciliation. Moze, now gone, is shown present in the church. Edna gently passes the communion tray to her late husband, Royce, who then passes it to Wylie, the boy who accidentally killed him. They exchange the words, "Peace of God," as the camera lingers on them in solemn silence.

== Cast ==
- Sally Field as Edna Spalding
- Lindsay Crouse as Margaret Lomax, Edna's sister
- Ed Harris as Wayne Lomax, Margaret's husband
- Amy Madigan as Viola Kelsey
- John Malkovich as Mr. Will
- Danny Glover as Moses "Moze" Hadner
- Lane Smith as Albert Denby (Banker)
- Terry O'Quinn as Buddy Kelsey, Viola's husband
- Bert Remsen as Tee Tot Hightower
- Yankton Hatten as Frank Spalding, Edna's son
- Gennie James as Possum Spalding, Edna's daughter
- Ray Baker as Sheriff Royce Spalding, Edna's late husband
- Jay Patterson as W.E. Simmons
- Toni Hudson as Ermine
- DeVoreaux White as Wylie
- Bill Thurman as Homer
- Jerry Haynes as Deputy Jack Driscoll

== Production ==
Regarding the unique ending, writer-director Robert Benton explained why he ended an otherwise realistic movie with a fantasy scene incorporating equality, grace and forgiveness, tenets of Christianity:

"There are certain things images can explain that words cannot. There is something in the image of the man who has been killed handing the communion plate to the boy who killed him that seems very moving to me in ways I cannot explain. I had the ending before I ever finished the screenplay, although I knew audiences would be confused by it."

== Release ==
Places in the Heart was released in theatres on September 21, 1984. The film was released on DVD on October 9, 2001, by Sony Pictures Home Entertainment.

== Reception ==
=== Box office ===
Places in the Heart grossed $274,279 in its opening weekend. The film grossed $34.9 million in the US.

=== Critical response ===
Review aggregator Rotten Tomatoes gives the film a score of 90% based on reviews from 40 critics. The consensus is: "Places in the Heart is a quiet character piece with grand ambitions that it more than fulfills, thanks to absorbing work from writer-director Robert Benton and a tremendous cast." Metacritic gives the film a score of 70% based on reviews from 12 critics, indicating "generally favorable reviews".

Vincent Canby of The New York Times wrote in his review: "Robert Benton has made one of the best films in years about growing up American." Canby called it "moving and often funny" and "a tonic, a revivifying experience right down to the final images", comparing it to Luis Buñuel's Tristana". Roger Ebert gave the film three of four stars, writing that Benton's "memories provide the material for a wonderful movie, and he has made it, but unfortunately he hasn't stopped at that. He has gone on to include too much. He tells a central story of great power, and then keeps leaving it to catch us up with minor characters we never care about."

=== Accolades ===
In 1985, when Sally Field accepted her second Academy Award for Best Actress (the first was for Norma Rae), she uttered the memorable and much-mocked line "I can't deny the fact that you like me—right now, you like me!" It is commonly misquoted as "You like me—you really like me!"

The February 2020 issue of New York magazine lists Places in the Heart as among "The Best Movies That Lost Best Picture at the Oscars."

Award	Category	Nominee(s)	Result	Ref.
Academy Awards	Best Picture	Arlene Donovan	Nominated	
Academy Awards	Best Director	Robert Benton	Nominated	
Academy Awards	Best Actress	Sally Field	Won	
Academy Awards	Best Supporting Actor	John Malkovich	Nominated	
Academy Awards	Best Supporting Actress	Lindsay Crouse	Nominated	
Academy Awards	Best Screenplay – Written Directly for the Screen	Robert Benton	Won	
Academy Awards	Best Costume Design	Ann Roth	Nominated	
Berlin International Film Festival	Golden Bear	Robert Benton	Nominated	
Berlin International Film Festival	Best Director	Robert Benton	Won	
Berlin International Film Festival	OCIC Award – Competition	Robert Benton	Won	
Boston Society of Film Critics Awards	Best Supporting Actor	John Malkovich (Note: Also for The Killing Fields.)	Won	
Directors Guild of America Awards	Outstanding Directorial Achievement in Motion Pictures	Robert Benton	Nominated	
Golden Globe Awards	Best Motion Picture – Drama		Nominated	
Golden Globe Awards	Best Actress in a Motion Picture – Drama	Sally Field	Won	
Golden Globe Awards	Best Screenplay – Motion Picture	Robert Benton	Nominated	
Golden Reel Awards	Best Sound Editing – Sound Effects	Richard P. Cirincione and Maurice Schell	Won (Note: Tied with The River.)	
Kansas City Film Critics Circle Awards	Best Supporting Actor	John Malkovich	Won	
Los Angeles Film Critics Association Awards	Best Supporting Actor	John Malkovich	Runner-up	
National Board of Review Awards	Top Ten Films		4th Place	
National Board of Review Awards	Best Supporting Actor	John Malkovich	Won	
National Society of Film Critics Awards	Best Supporting Actor	John Malkovich	Won	
New York Film Critics Circle Awards	Best Supporting Actor	John Malkovich	Runner-up	
New York Film Critics Circle Awards	Best Screenplay	Robert Benton	Won	
New York Film Critics Circle Awards	Best Cinematographer	Néstor Almendros	Nominated	
Toronto International Film Festival	People's Choice Award	Robert Benton	Won	
Writers Guild of America Awards	Best Screenplay – Written Directly for the Screen	Robert Benton	Nominated	
Young Artist Awards	Best Young Supporting Actress in a Motion Picture	Gennie James	Nominated	

The film is recognized by American Film Institute in these lists:

- 2006: AFI's 100 Years...100 Cheers – #95
