= National Board of Review Awards 1984 =

Annual US film awards ceremony

56th National Board of Review Awards

December 17, 1984

Best Picture:
A Passage to India

The 56th National Board of Review Awards were announced on 17 December 1984.

== Top Ten Films ==
1. A Passage to India
2. Paris, Texas
3. The Killing Fields
4. Places in the Heart
5. Mass Appeal
6. Country
7. A Soldier's Story
8. Birdy
9. Careful, He Might Hear You
10. Under the Volcano

== Top Foreign films ==
1. A Sunday in the Country
2. Carmen
3. A Love in Germany
4. The Fourth Man
5. The Basileus Quartet

== Winners ==
- Best Picture:
  - A Passage to India
- Best Foreign Language Film:
  - Un dimanche à la campagne (A Sunday in the Country), France
- Best Actor:
  - Victor Banerjee - A Passage to India
- Best Actress:
  - Peggy Ashcroft - A Passage to India
- Best Supporting Actor:
  - John Malkovich - Places in the Heart
- Best Supporting Actress:
  - Sabine Azéma - Un dimanche à la campagne (A Sunday in the Country)
- Best Director:
  - David Lean - A Passage to India
- Career Achievement Award:
  - John Huston
