= 1984 Los Angeles Film Critics Association Awards =

Annual US film awards ceremony

10th LAFCA Awards
- Date: December 5, 1984

Highlights
- Best Picture: Amadeus

The 10th Los Angeles Film Critics Association Awards were announced on 5 December 1984 and given on 24 January 1985.

== Winners ==
- Best Picture:
  - Amadeus
  - Runner-up: Once Upon a Time in America
- Best Director:
  - Miloš Forman - Amadeus
  - Runner-up: Sergio Leone – Once Upon a Time in America
- Best Actor (tie):
  - F. Murray Abraham – Amadeus
  - Albert Finney – Under the Volcano
- Best Actress:
  - Kathleen Turner - Crimes of Passion and Romancing the Stone
  - Runner-up: Vanessa Redgrave – The Bostonians
- Best Supporting Actor:
  - Adolph Caesar - A Soldier's Story
  - Runner-up: John Malkovich – Places in the Heart and The Killing Fields
- Best Supporting Actress:
  - Peggy Ashcroft – A Passage to India
  - Runner-up: Christine Lahti – Swing Shift
- Best Screenplay:
  - Peter Shaffer - Amadeus
  - Runner-up: Alan Rudolph – Choose Me
- Best Cinematography:
  - Chris Menges – The Killing Fields
  - Runner-up: Robby Müller – Repo Man and Paris, Texas
- Best Music Score:
  - Ennio Morricone – Once Upon a Time in America
  - Runner-up: Amadeus
- Best Foreign Film:
  - The Fourth Man (De vierde man) • Netherlands
  - Runner-up: The Gods Must Be Crazy • Botswana/South Africa
- Experimental/Independent Film/Video Award:
  - George Kuchar (for the body of his work)
- New Generation Award:
  - Alan Rudolph
- Career Achievement Award:
  - Rouben Mamoulian
- Special Citation:
  - Andrew Sarris
  - François Truffaut
