= 42nd Golden Globe Awards =

Film award ceremony in 1985

- Date: January 27, 1985
- Site: Beverly Hilton Hotel; Beverly Hills, Los Angeles, California
- Hosted by: Michael York; Raquel Welch

Highlights
- Best Film: Drama: Amadeus
- Best Film: Musical or Comedy: Romancing the Stone
- Best Drama Series: Murder, She Wrote
- Best Musical or Comedy Series: The Cosby Show
- Most awards: (4) Amadeus
- Most nominations: (6) The Killing Fields

The 42nd Golden Globe Awards, honoring the best in film and television for 1984, were held on January 27, 1985.

== Winners and nominees ==
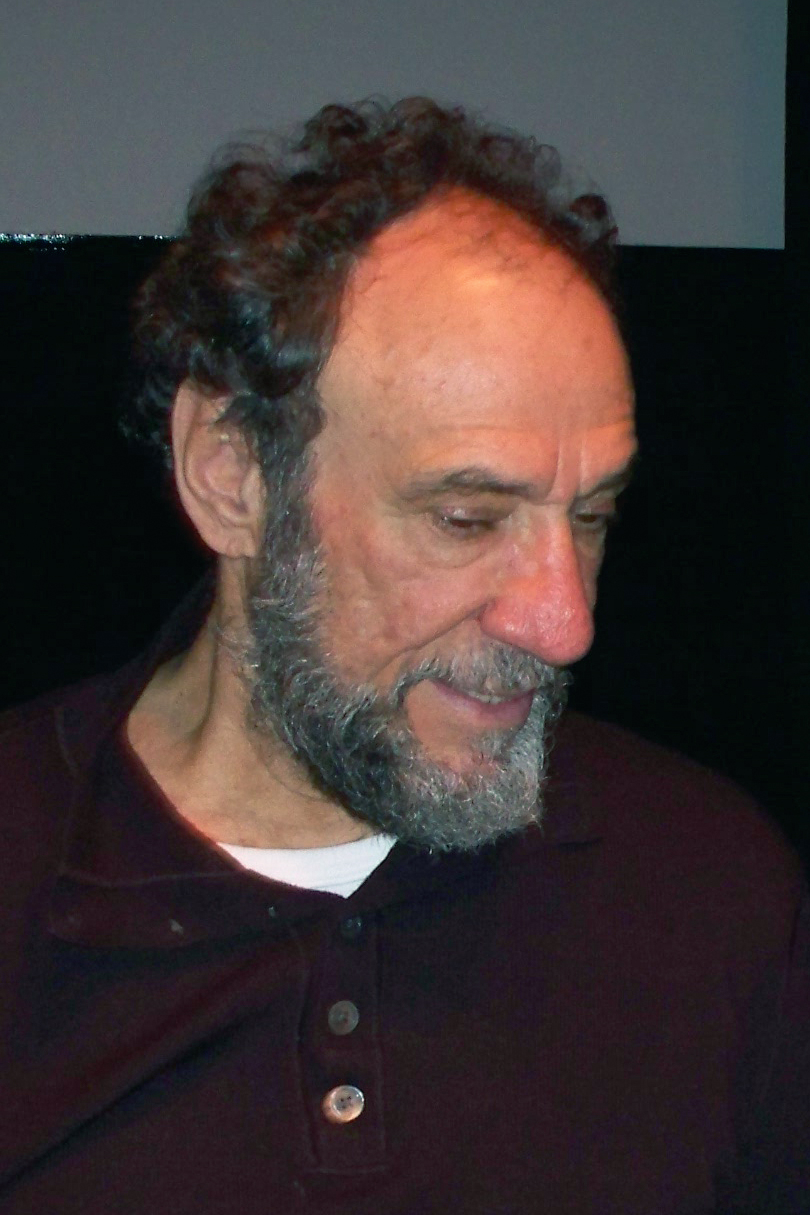
F. Murray Abraham — Best Actor in a Motion Picture, Drama winner

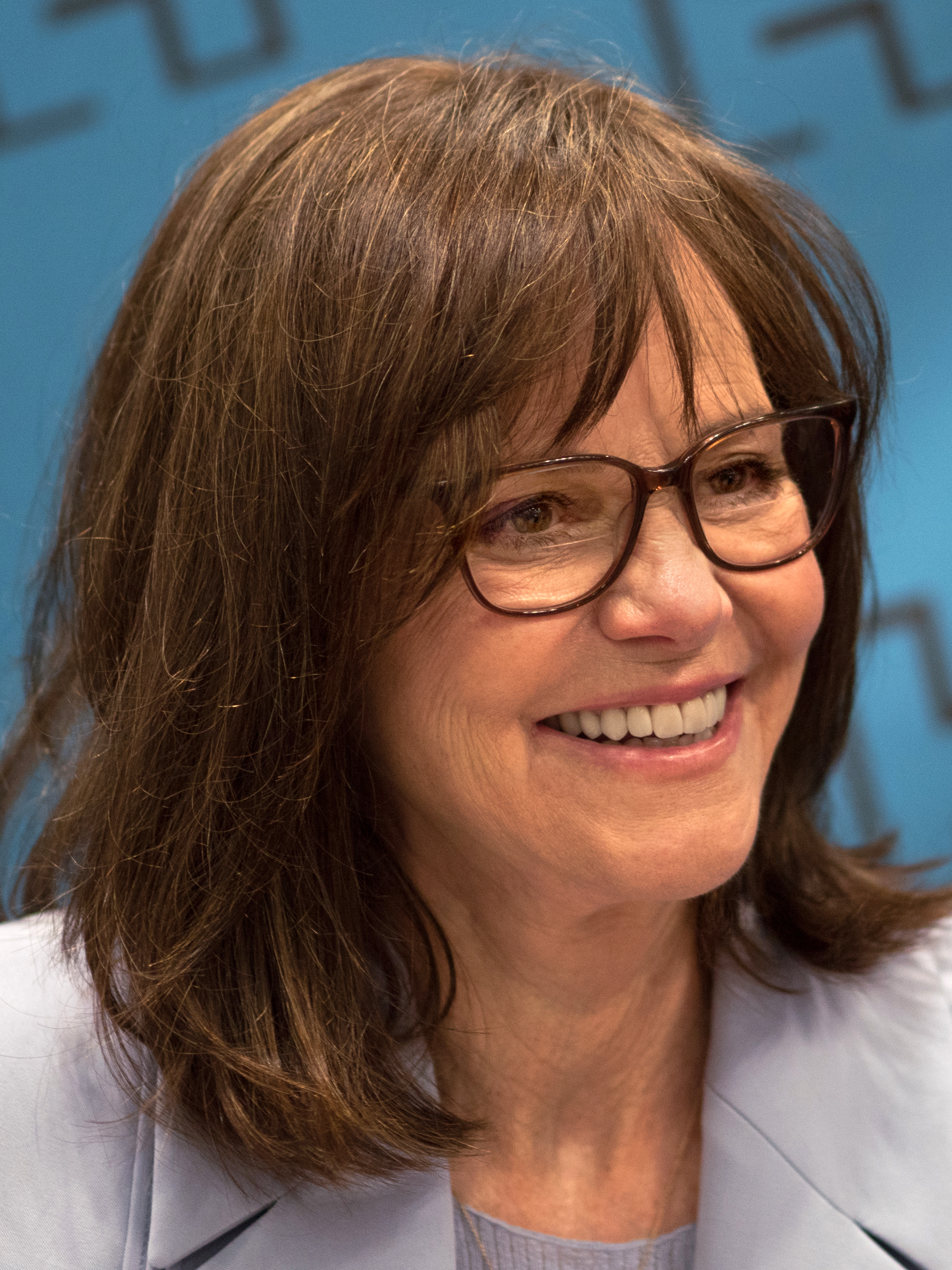
Sally Field — Best Actress in a Motion Picture, Drama winner

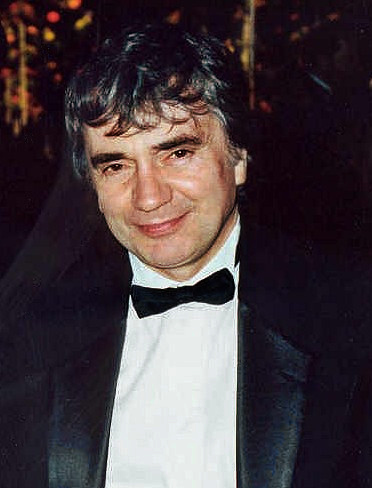
Dudley Moore — Best Actor in a Motion Picture, Comedy or Musical winner

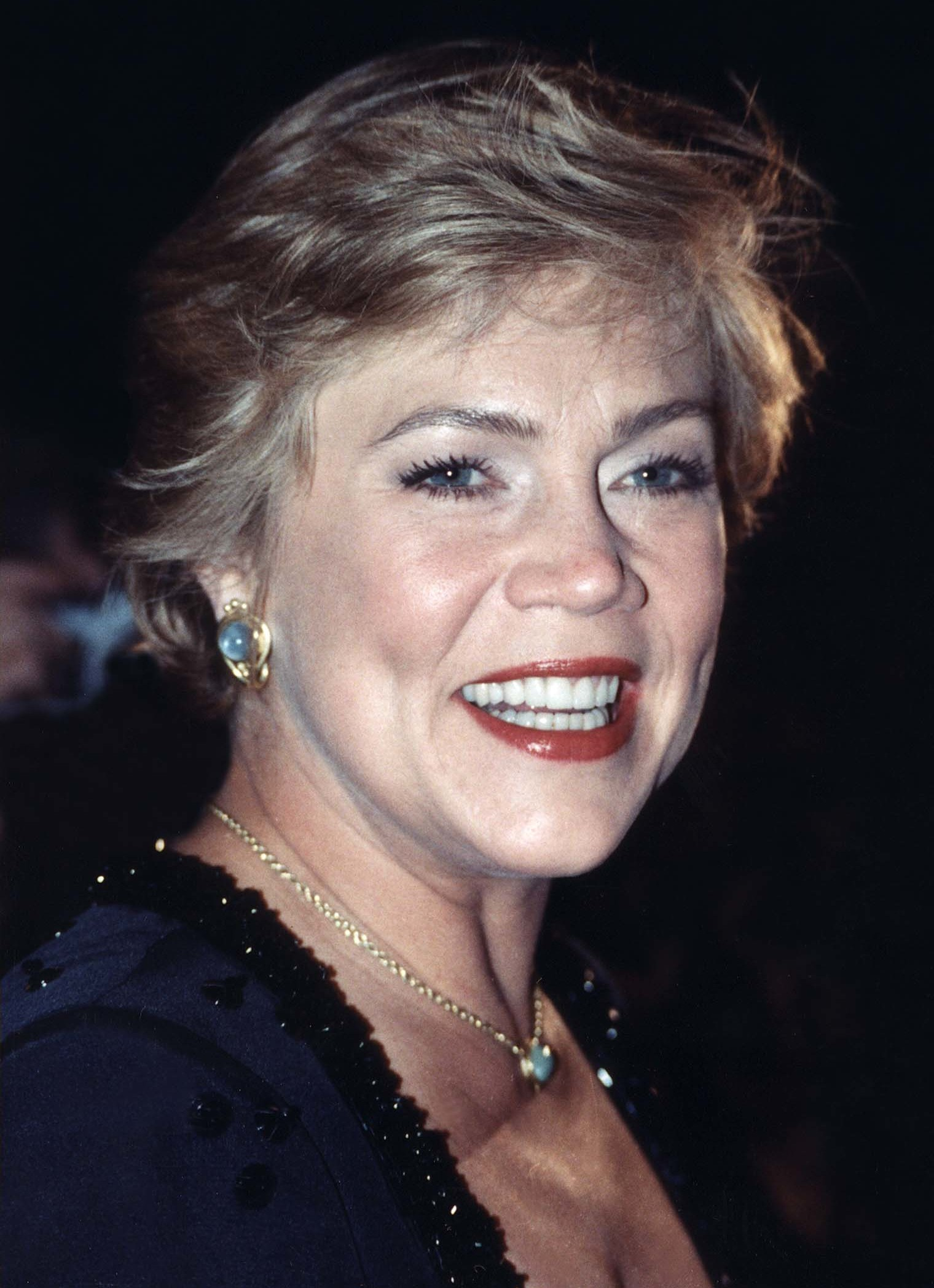
Kathleen Turner — Best Actress in a Motion Picture, Comedy or Musical winner

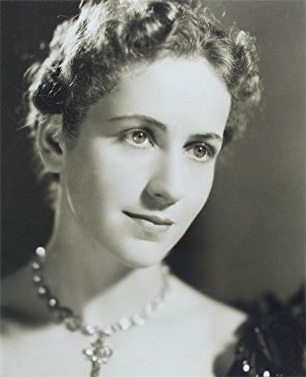
Peggy Ashcroft — Best Supporting Actress in a Motion Picture, winner

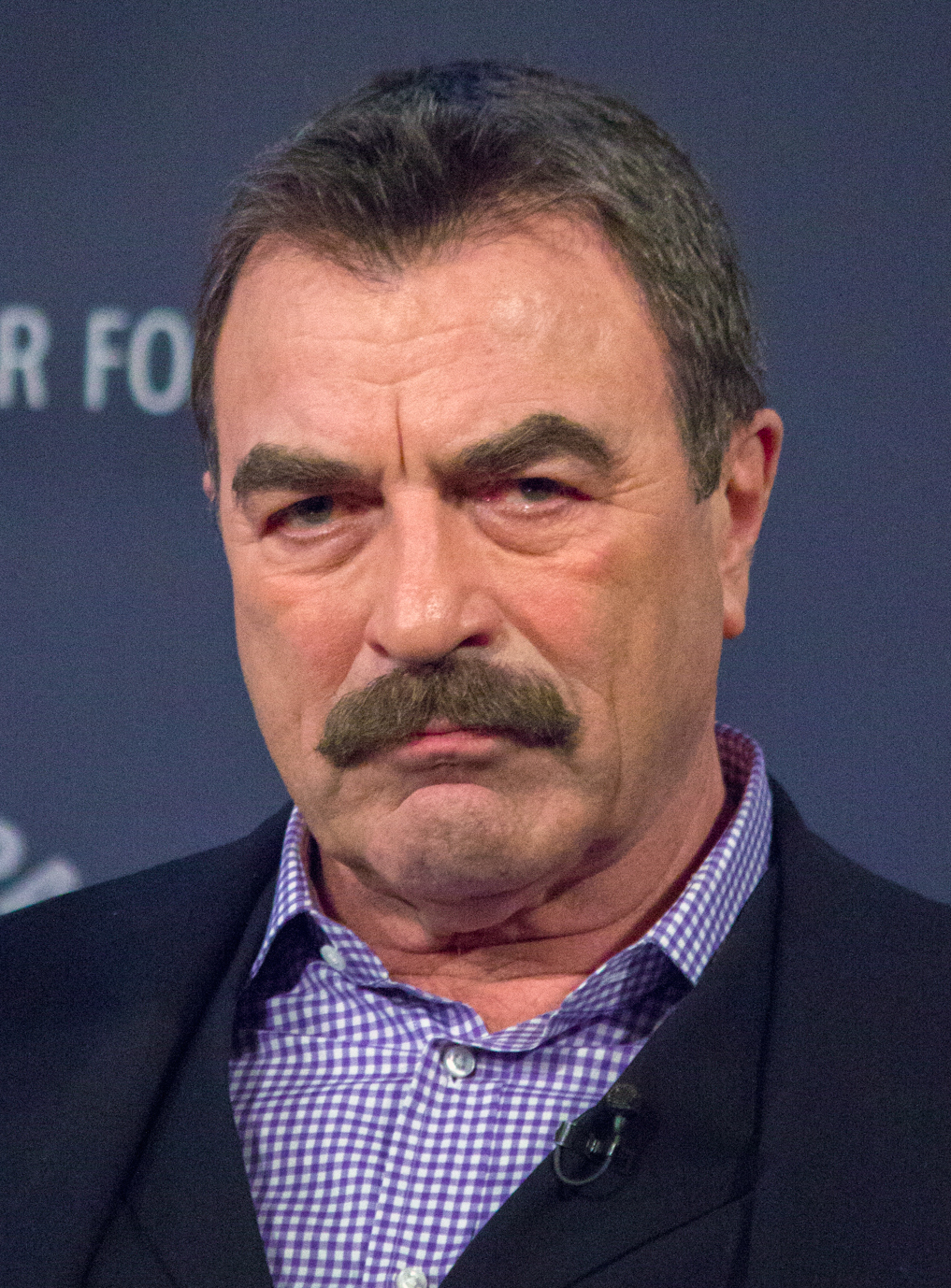
Tom Selleck — Best Actor in a Television Series, Drama winner

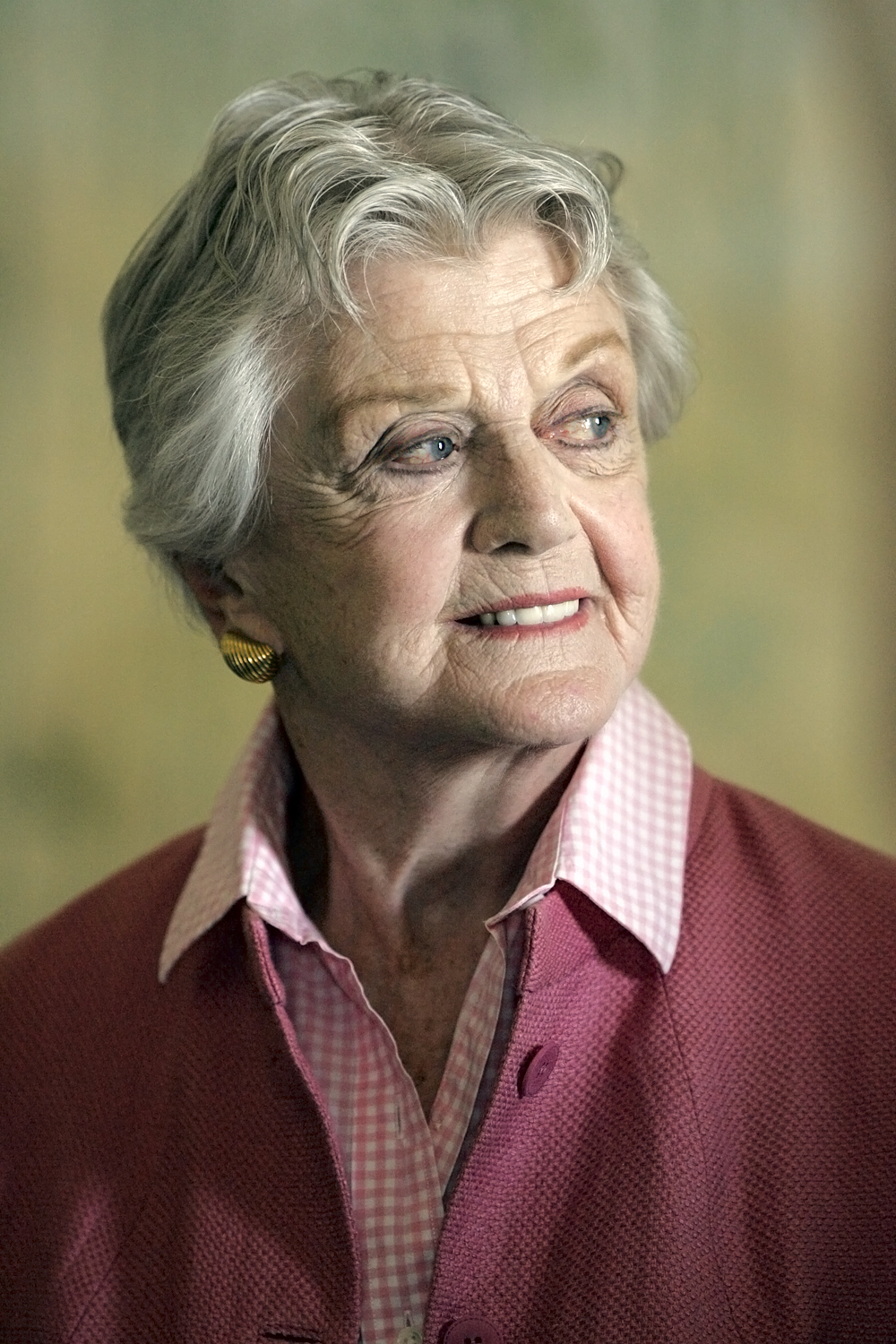
Angela Lansbury — Best Actress in a Television Series, Drama winner

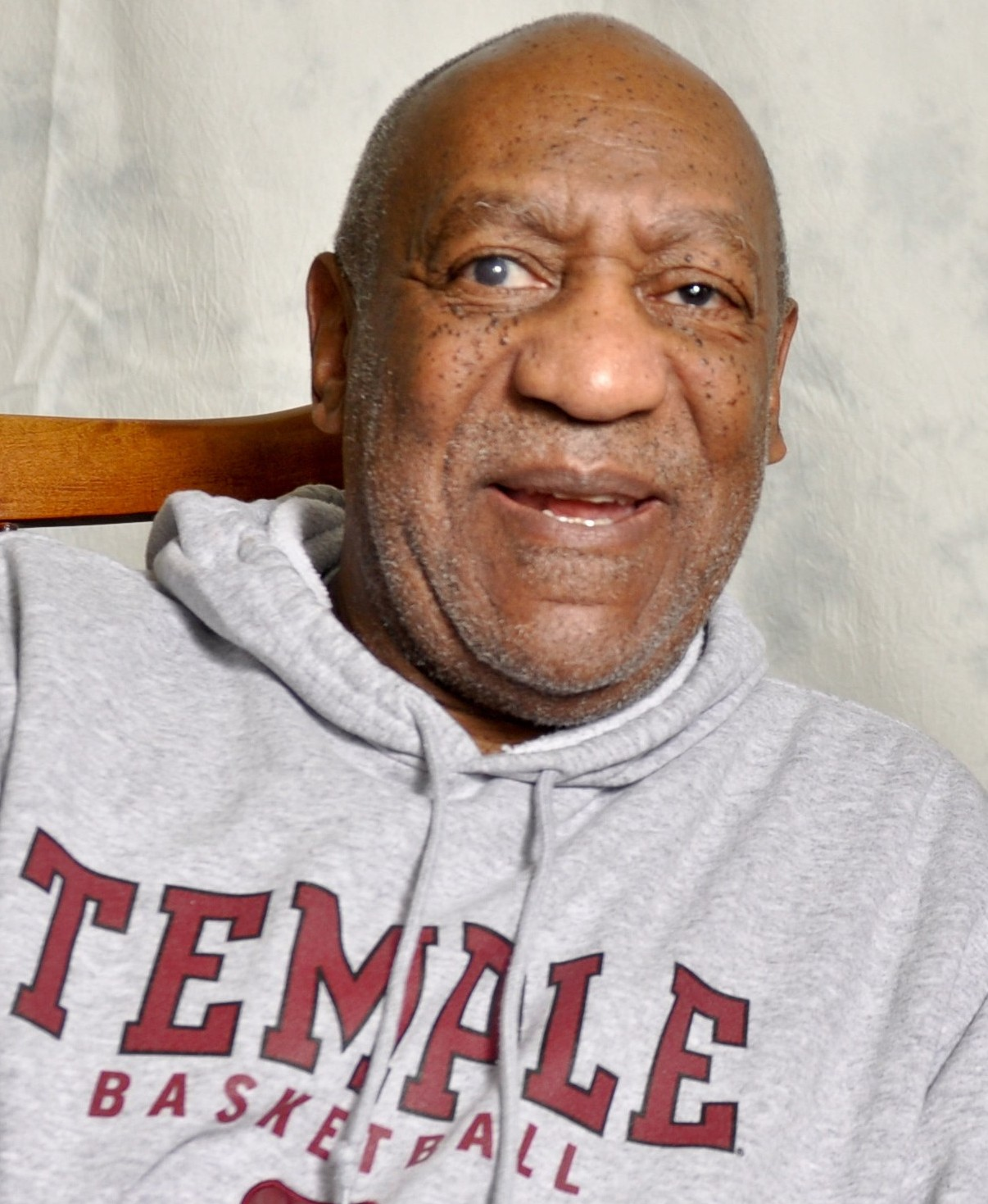
Bill Cosby — Best Actor in a Television Series, Comedy or Musical winner

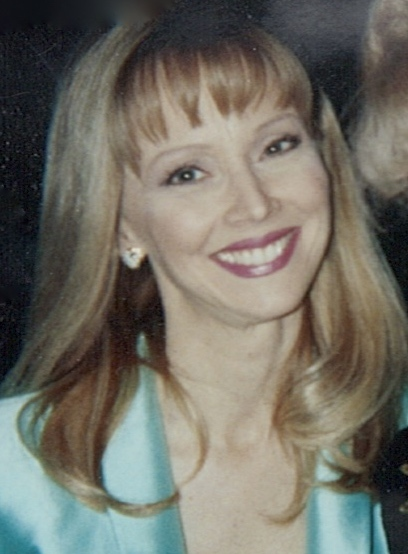
Shelley Long — Best Actress in a Television Series, Comedy or Musical winner

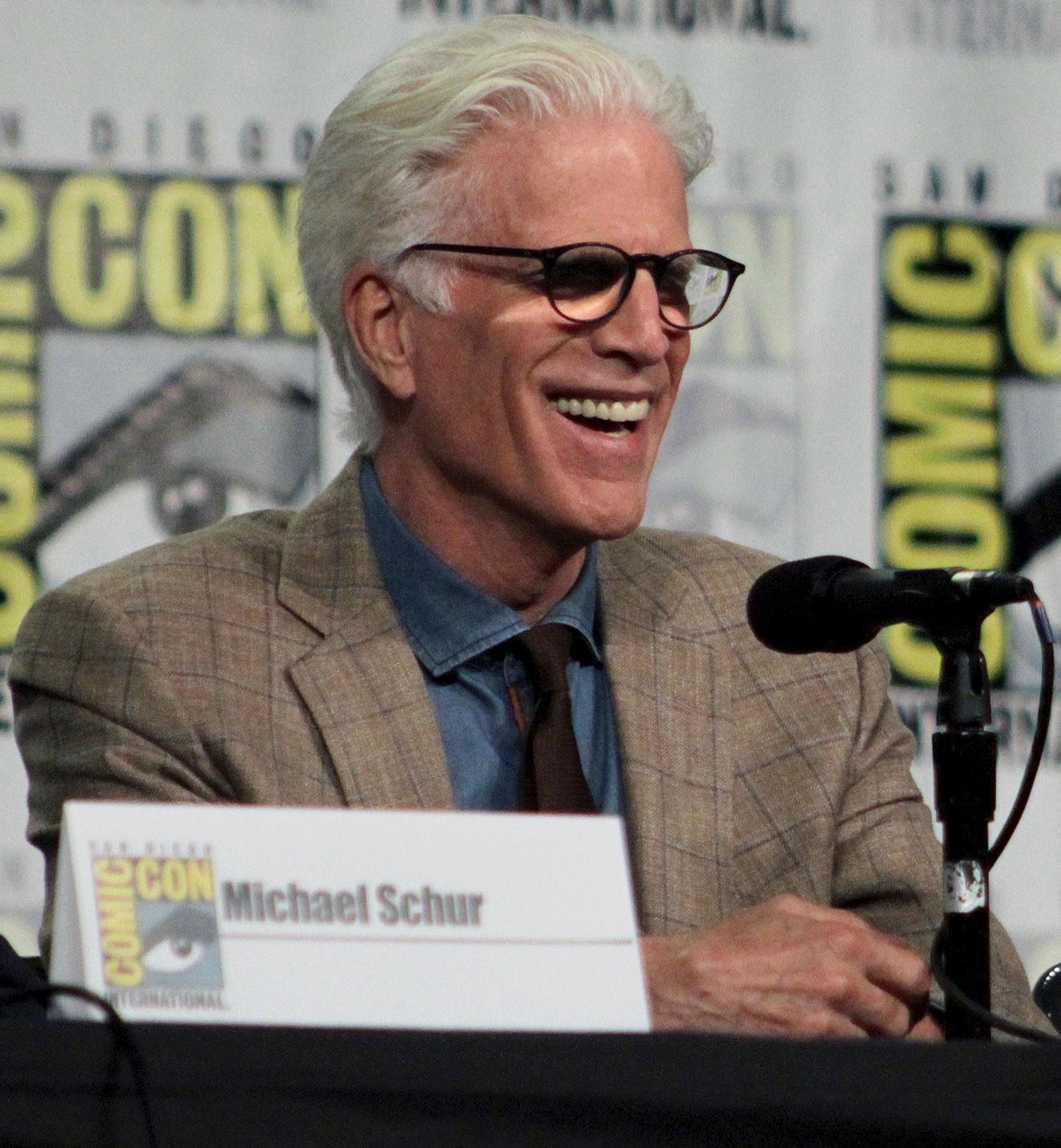
Ted Danson — Best Actor in a Miniseries or Television Film, winner

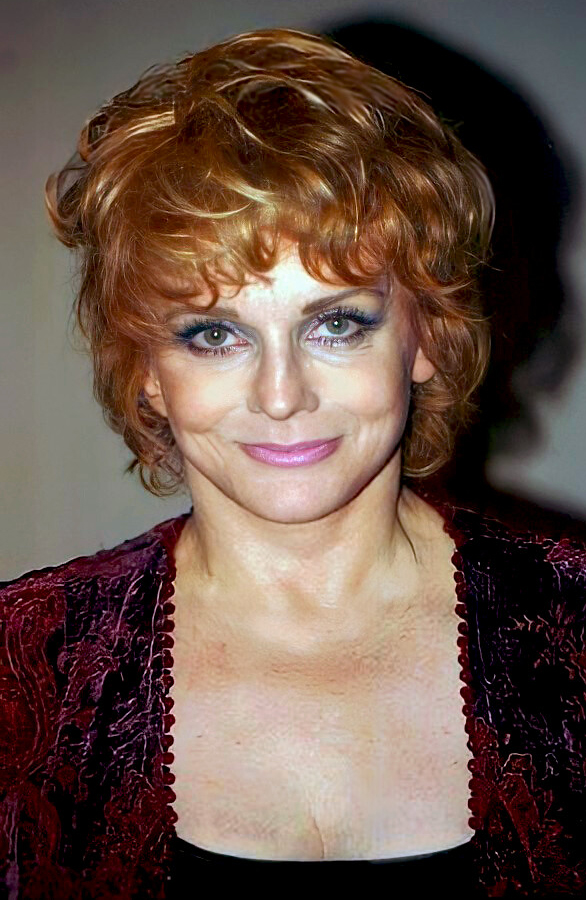
Ann-Margret — Best Actress in a Miniseries or Television Film, winner

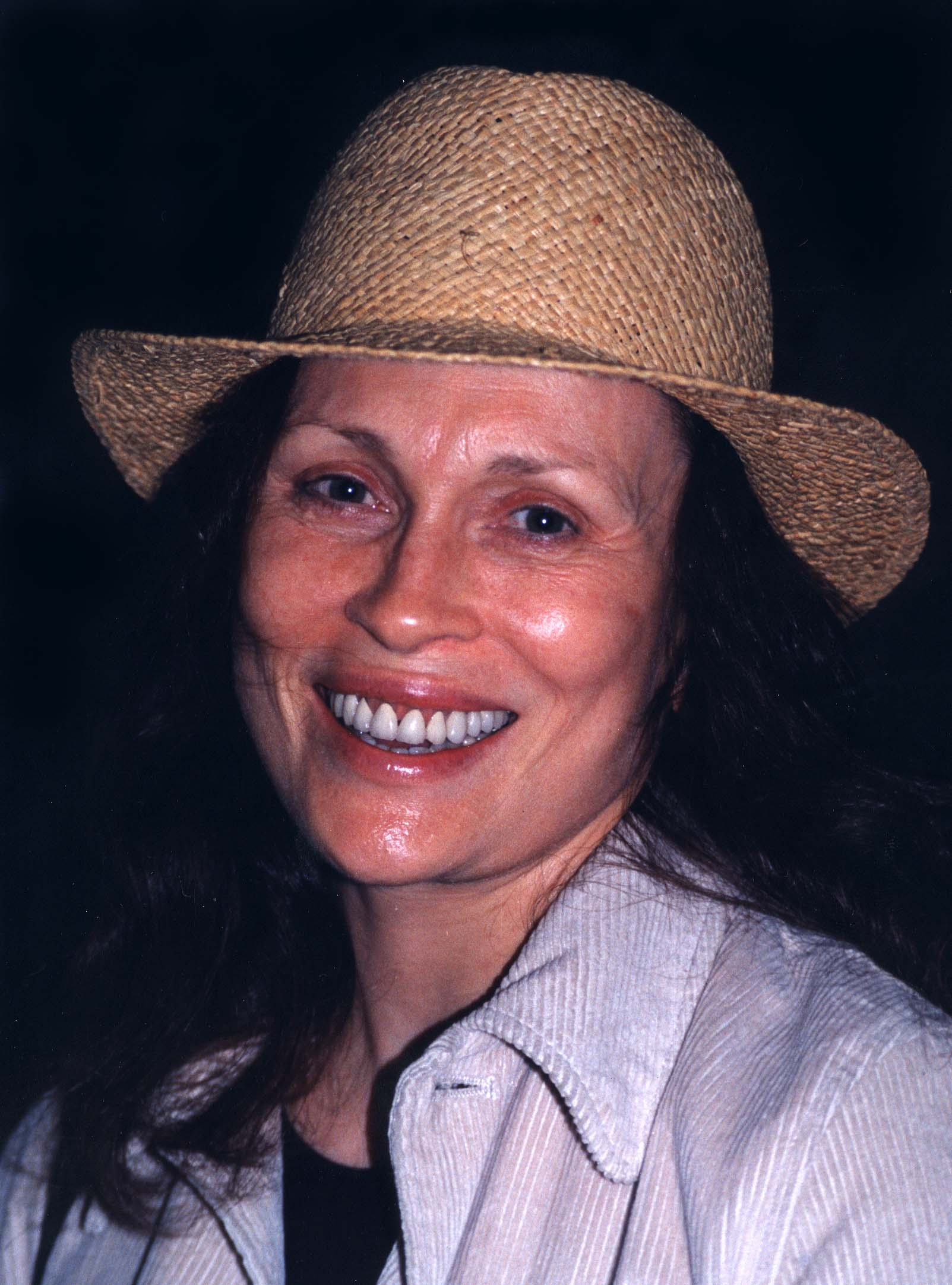
Faye Dunaway — Best Supporting Actress in a Series, Miniseries or Motion Picture Made for Television, winner

=== Film ===
Best Motion Picture
Drama	Comedy or Musical
Amadeus; The Cotton Club; The Killing Fields; Places in the Heart; A Soldier's Story	Romancing the Stone; Beverly Hills Cop; Ghostbusters; Micki & Maude; Splash
Best Performance in a Motion Picture – Drama
Actor	Actress
F. Murray Abraham – Amadeus as Antonio Salieri; Jeff Bridges – Starman as Starman/Scott Hayden; Albert Finney – Under the Volcano as Geoffrey Firmin; Tom Hulce – Amadeus as Wolfgang Amadeus Mozart; Sam Waterston – The Killing Fields as Sydney Schanberg	Sally Field – Places in the Heart as Edna Spalding; Diane Keaton – Mrs. Soffel as Kate Soffel; Jessica Lange – Country as Jewell Ivy; Vanessa Redgrave – The Bostonians as Olive Chancellor; Sissy Spacek – The River as Mae Garvey
Best Performance in a Motion Picture – Comedy or Musical
Actor	Actress
Dudley Moore – Micki & Maude as Rob Salinger; Steve Martin – All of Me as Roger Cobb; Eddie Murphy – Beverly Hills Cop as Axel Foley; Bill Murray – Ghostbusters as Peter Venkman; Robin Williams – Moscow on the Hudson as Vladimir Ivanov	Kathleen Turner – Romancing the Stone as Joan Wilder; Anne Bancroft – Garbo Talks as Estelle Rolfe; Mia Farrow – Broadway Danny Rose as Tina Vitale; Shelley Long – Irreconcilable Differences as Lucy Van Patten Brodsky; Lily Tomlin – All of Me as Edwina Cutwater
Best Supporting Performance in a Motion Picture – Drama, Comedy or Musical
Supporting Actor	Supporting Actress
Haing S. Ngor – The Killing Fields as Dith Pran; Adolph Caesar – A Soldier's Story as Sgt. Waters; Richard Crenna – The Flamingo Kid as Phil Brody; Jeffrey Jones – Amadeus as Emperor Joseph II; Pat Morita – The Karate Kid as Mr. Miyagi	Peggy Ashcroft – A Passage to India as Mrs. Moore; Drew Barrymore – Irreconcilable Differences as Casey Brodsky; Kim Basinger – The Natural as Memo Paris; Jacqueline Bisset – Under the Volcano as Yvonne Firmin; Melanie Griffith – Body Double as Holly Body; Christine Lahti – Swing Shift as Hazel Zanussi; Lesley Ann Warren – Songwriter as Gilda
Other
Best Director	Best Screenplay
Miloš Forman – Amadeus; Francis Ford Coppola – The Cotton Club; Roland Joffé – The Killing Fields; David Lean – A Passage to India; Sergio Leone – Once Upon a Time in America	Amadeus – Peter Shaffer; The Killing Fields – Bruce Robinson; A Passage to India – David Lean; Places in the Heart – Robert Benton; A Soldier's Story – Charles Fuller
Best Original Score	Best Original Song
A Passage to India – Maurice Jarre; The Killing Fields – Mike Oldfield; Once Upon a Time in America – Ennio Morricone; The River – John Williams; Starman – Jack Nitzsche	"I Just Called to Say I Love You" (Stevie Wonder) – The Woman in Red; "Against All Odds (Take a Look at Me Now)" (Phil Collins) – Against All Odds; "Footloose" (Kenny Loggins, Dean Pitchford) – Footloose; "Ghostbusters" (Ray Parker Jr.) – Ghostbusters; "No More Lonely Nights" (Paul McCartney) – Give My Regards to Broad Street; "When Doves Cry" (Prince) – Purple Rain
Best Foreign Film
A Passage to India (UK); Carmen (France); Dangerous Moves (Switzerland); Paris, Texas (West Germany/France); A Sunday in the Country (France)

The following films received multiple nominations:

Nominations	Title
6	The Killing Fields
5	Amadeus
5	A Passage to India
3	Ghostbusters
3	Places in the Heart
3	A Soldier's Story
2	All of Me
2	Beverly Hills Cop
2	The Cotton Club
2	Irreconcilable Differences
2	Micki & Maude
2	The River
2	Romancing the Stone
2	Starman
2	Under the Volcano

The following films received multiple wins:

Wins	Title
4	Amadeus
3	A Passage to India
2	Romancing the Stone

=== Television ===
Best Television Series
Drama	Musical or Comedy
Murder, She Wrote: Cagney & Lacey; Dynasty; Hill Street Blues; St. Elsewhere	The Cosby Show: Cheers; Fame; The Jeffersons; Kate & Allie
Best Performance in a Television Series – Drama
Actor	Actress
Tom Selleck - Magnum, P.I. as Thomas Sullivan Magnum III: James Brolin - Hotel as Peter McDermott; John Forsythe - Dynasty as Blake Carrington; Larry Hagman - Dallas as J.R. Ewing; Stacy Keach - Mickey Spillane's Mike Hammer as Mike Hammer; Daniel J. Travanti - Hill Street Blues as Captain Francis "Frank" Furillo	Angela Lansbury - Murder, She Wrote as Jessica Fletcher: Joan Collins - Dynasty as Alexis Colby; Tyne Daly - Cagney & Lacey as Det. Marry Beth Lacey; Linda Evans - Dynasty as Krystle Carrington; Sharon Gless - Cagney & Lacey as Det. Sgt. Christine Cagney; Kate Jackson - Scarecrow and Mrs. King as Amanda King
Best Performance in a Television Series – Musical or Comedy
Actor	Actress
Bill Cosby - The Cosby Show as Dr. Heathcliff "Cliff" Huxtable: Ted Danson - Cheers as Sam Malone; Robert Guillaume - Benson as Benson DuBois; Sherman Hemsley - The Jeffersons as George Jefferson; Bob Newhart - Newhart as Dick Loudon	Shelley Long - Cheers as Diane Chambers: Debbie Allen - Fame as Lydia Grant; Nell Carter - Gimme a Break! as Nellie "Nell" Ruth Harper; Susan Clark - Webster as Katherine Calder-Young Papadopolis; Jane Curtin - Kate & Allie as Allie Lowell; Isabel Sanford - The Jeffersons as Louise Jefferson
Best Performance in a Miniseries or Television Film
Actor	Actress
Ted Danson - Something About Amelia as Steven Bennett: James Garner - Heartsounds as Harold Lear; Sam Neill - Reilly: Ace of Spies as Sidney Reilly; Jason Robards - Sakharov as Andrei Sakharov; Treat Williams - A Streetcar Named Desire as Stanley Kowalski	Ann-Margret - A Streetcar Named Desire as Blanche DuBois: Glenn Close - Something About Amelia as Gail Bennett; Farrah Fawcett - The Burning Bed as Francine Hughes; Jane Fonda - The Dollmaker as Gertie; Glenda Jackson - Sakharov as Yelena Bonner
Best Supporting Performance in a Series, Miniseries or Television Film
Supporting Actor	Supporting Actress
Paul Le Mat - The Burning Bed as James Berlin "Mickey" Hughes: Pierce Brosnan - Nancy Astor as Robert Gould Shaw; John Hillerman - Magnum, P.I. as Johnathan Quayle Higgins III; Ben Vereen - Ellis Island as Roscoe Haines; Bruce Weitz - Hill Street Blues as Det. Mick Belker	Faye Dunaway - Ellis Island as Maud Chareris: Selma Diamond - Night Court as Selma Hacker; Marla Gibbs - The Jeffersons as Florence Johnston; Gina Lollobrigida - Falcon Crest as Francesca Gioberti; Rhea Perlman - Cheers as Carla Tortelli; Roxana Zal - Something About Amelia as Amelia Bennett
Best Miniseries or Television Film
Something About Amelia: The Burning Bed; The Dollmaker; Sakharov; A Streetcar Named Desire

The following programs received multiple nominations:

Nominations	Title
4	Cheers
4	The Jeffersons
4	Dynasty
4	Something About Amelia
3	The Burning Bed
3	Cagney & Lacey
3	Hill Street Blues
3	Sakharov
3	A Streetcar Named Desire
2	The Cosby Show
2	The Dollmaker
2	Fame
2	Kate & Allie
2	Magnum P.I.
2	Murder, She Wrote
2	Ellis Island

The following programs received multiple wins:

Wins	Title
2	The Cosby Show
2	Murder, She Wrote
2	Something About Amelia

== Ceremony ==
=== Presenters ===
- Christopher Atkins
- Karen Black
- Bruce Boxleitner
- Sonia Braga
- Eileen Brennan
- Diahann Carroll
- Lynda Carter
- Nell Carter
- Joanna Cassidy
- Mary Crosby
- Jamie Lee Curtis
- Angie Dickinson
- Faye Dunaway
- Morgan Fairchild
- Peter Falk
- Peter Fonda
- Glenn Ford
- Elliott Gould
- Stewart Granger
- Engelbert Humperdinck
- Ann Jillian
- Howard Keel
- Kris Kristofferson
- Diane Lane
- Cloris Leachman
- Rich Little
- Tony Lo Bianco
- Rob Lowe
- Marilyn McCoo
- Donna Mills
- Liza Minnelli
- Michael Pare
- Nia Peeples
- George Peppard
- Alfonso Ribeiro
- Ricky Schroder
- William Shatner
- Brooke Shields
- Andrew Stevens
- Cicely Tyson

=== Cecil B. DeMille Award ===
Elizabeth Taylor

== See also ==
- 57th Academy Awards
- 5th Golden Raspberry Awards
- 36th Primetime Emmy Awards
- 37th Primetime Emmy Awards
- 38th British Academy Film Awards
- 39th Tony Awards
- 1984 in film
- 1984 in American television
