= Boston Society of Film Critics Awards 1984 =

Annual US film awards ceremony

5th BSFC Awards

January 20, 1985

Best Film:
The Killing Fields

The 5th Boston Society of Film Critics Awards honored the best filmmaking of 1984. The awards were given on 20 January 1985.

== Winners ==
- Best Film:
  - The Killing Fields
- Best Actor:
  - Haing S. Ngor – The Killing Fields
- Best Actress:
  - Judy Davis – A Passage to India
- Best Supporting Actor:
  - John Malkovich – The Killing Fields and Places in the Heart
- Best Supporting Actress:
  - Peggy Ashcroft – A Passage to India
- Best Director:
  - Bertrand Tavernier – A Sunday in the Country (Un dimanche à la campagne)
- Best Screenplay:
  - Alex Cox – Repo Man
- Best Cinematography:
  - Chris Menges – The Killing Fields
- Best Documentary:
  - The Times of Harvey Milk
- Best Foreign-Language Film:
  - A Sunday in the Country (Un dimanche à la campagne) • France
