= Body Double =

1984 film by Brian De Palma

- Theatrical release poster
- Directed by: Brian De Palma
- Screenplay by: Robert J. Avrech; Brian De Palma
- Story by: Brian De Palma
- Produced by: Brian De Palma
- Starring: Craig Wasson; Gregg Henry; Melanie Griffith
- Cinematography: Stephen H. Burum
- Edited by: Jerry Greenberg; Bill Pankow
- Music by: Pino Donaggio
- Production company: Delphi II Productions
- Distributed by: Columbia Pictures
- Release date: October 26, 1984
- Running time: 114 minutes
- Country: United States
- Language: English
- Budget: $10 million
- Box office: $8.8 million

Body Double is a 1984 American neo-noir erotic thriller film directed, co-written, and produced by Brian De Palma, and starring Craig Wasson, Gregg Henry, Melanie Griffith, and Deborah Shelton. The film is a direct homage to the 1950s films of Alfred Hitchcock, specifically Rear Window, Vertigo, and Dial M for Murder, taking plot lines and themes (such as voyeurism, panic attacks, and obsession) from the first two.

At the time of its release, the film was a commercial failure, earning $8.8 million at the box office against a production budget of $10 million, as well as mixed reviews, though Griffith's performance earned praise and earned her a nomination for the Golden Globe Award for Best Supporting Actress – Motion Picture. Subsequently, the film received positive appraisal from cinema fans and is now considered to be a cult film.

== Plot ==
In Los Angeles, struggling actor Jake Scully has recently lost his role as a vampire in a low-budget horror film after his claustrophobia thwarts shooting. Upon returning home to discover his girlfriend Carol cheating on him, Scully splits up with her and is left homeless. At a method acting class, where he meets Sam Bouchard, Scully reveals his fears and the childhood cause of his claustrophobia. They go to a bar where Scully is offered a place to stay; Sam's rich friend Alan has gone on a trip to Europe and needs a house-sitter for his ultra-modern home in the Hollywood Hills.

While touring the house with Scully, Sam is especially enthusiastic about showing him one feature: a telescope, and through it a female neighbor, Gloria Revelle, who erotically dances at a specific time each night. Scully voyeuristically watches Gloria until he sees her being abused by a man she appears to know. The next day, he follows her when she goes shopping. Gloria makes calls to an unknown person whom she promises to meet. Scully also notices a disfigured Indian, a man he had noticed watching Gloria a few days prior.

Scully follows Gloria to a seaside motel where she is apparently stood up by the person she was there to meet. On the beach, the Indian suddenly appears and snatches her purse. Scully chases him into a nearby tunnel, but his claustrophobia overcomes him. Gloria walks him out of it, and they impulsively kiss before she retreats. That night, Scully again is watching through the telescope when the Indian returns and breaks into Gloria's home. Scully races to save Gloria, but her vicious white German Shepherd attacks him, and the Indian murders Gloria with a huge handheld drill.

Scully alerts the police, who rule the murder a botched robbery. However, Detective Jim McLean becomes suspicious after finding a pair of Gloria's panties in Scully's pocket. Although McLean does not arrest him, he tells Scully that his voyeuristic behavior and failure to alert police sooner helped cause Gloria's death. Later that night, suffering from insomnia and watching a pornographic television channel, Scully sees porn actress Holly Body dancing sensually, exactly as Gloria did. In order to meet Holly, he is hired as a porn actor in Holly's new film.

Scully learns from Holly that Sam hired her to impersonate Gloria each night, dancing in the window, knowing Scully would be watching and later witness the real Gloria's murder. Offended when he suggests she was involved in a killing, Holly storms out of the house. An older man in a Ford Bronco picks her up, knocks her unconscious and drives away with her.

Scully follows the man and Holly to a reservoir where the man is digging a grave. Scully attacks him, and in the scuffle peels his face off to reveal it as a mask worn by Sam (who also disguised himself as the Indian earlier). Scully has been set up as a scapegoat by Sam, who is in fact Gloria's abusive husband Alex, to provide him with an alibi during the murder. Scully is overpowered and thrown into the grave. Though his claustrophobia initially incapacitates him again, he overcomes his fear and climbs out, and Sam is knocked into the aqueduct by Gloria's white German Shepherd and drowned. Some time later, Scully has been recast in his previous vampire role as Holly watches from the sidelines.

== Cast ==
- Craig Wasson as Jake Scully
- Gregg Henry as Sam Bouchard
- Melanie Griffith as Holly Body
- Deborah Shelton as Gloria Revelle
  - Helen Shaver as Gloria's voice (uncredited)
- Guy Boyd as Detective Jim McLean
- David Haskell as Will
- Dennis Franz as Rubin
- Al Israel as Corso
- Rebecca Stanley as Kimberly
- Douglas Warhit as video salesman
- B.J. Jones as Douglas
- Russ Marin as Frank
- Lane Davies as Billy
- Barbara Crampton as Carol
- Larry "Flash" Jenkins as assistant director
- Monte Landis as Sid Goldberg
- Mindi Miller as Tina
- Denise Loveday as Vampire's Kiss actress
- Michael Kearns as Mike
- Rob Paulsen as porno cameraman
- Slavitza Jovan as Bellini's saleslady
- Brinke Stevens as girl in bathroom
- Frankie Goes to Hollywood as nightclub band

The film includes appearances from real-life adult performers Linda Shaw, Alexandra Day, Cara Lott, Melissa Scott, Barbara Peckinpaugh and Annette Haven. Steven Bauer, from De Palma's previous film Scarface and Griffith's then-husband, has a cameo as a male porn actor.

== Production ==
=== Writing ===
After Brian De Palma's successes of Carrie, Dressed to Kill and his remake of Scarface, Columbia Pictures offered him a three-picture deal with Body Double set to be the first. De Palma created the concept of the film after interviewing Angie Dickinson's body doubles for Dressed to Kill. "I started thinking about the whole idea of the body double," he said. "I wondered what I would do if I wanted to make sure to get somebody's attention, to have them looking at a certain place at a certain time." The erotic thriller was also becoming a popular genre to audiences, with the box offices successes of Dressed to Kill and Body Heat. After fighting with censorship boards over the rating of Scarface — they rated it X and he had to battle to make it R – De Palma resolved to make Body Double as pushback. At the time, he said, "If this one doesn't get an X, nothing I ever do is going to. This is going to be the most erotic and surprising and thrilling movie I know how to make...I'm going to give them everything they hate and more of it than they've ever seen. They think Scarface was violent? They think my other movies were erotic? Wait until they see Body Double."

Having been impressed with the horror film Blood Bride, De Palma enlisted its director and writer Robert J. Avrech to write the Body Double script with him. Both were fans of Alfred Hitchcock, and screened Rear Window and Vertigo to gather inspiration. Avrech later described his work on the film as "working off of De Palma's ideas of Hitchcock's ideas."

=== Casting ===
De Palma initially wanted pornographic actress Annette Haven to play Holly, but she was rejected by the studio due to her pornographic filmography. Nonetheless, Haven did appear in a minor role and consulted with De Palma about the adult film industry. De Palma then offered the role to Linda Hamilton, who turned it down in favor of The Terminator. Jamie Lee Curtis, Carrie Fisher and Tatum O'Neal were considered for the role before Melanie Griffith was cast. De Palma later said Haven "was an enormous amount of help" to him in his understanding of the adult film industry and what Holly's background might be, and Griffith brought "a comic edge that I wanted to be a major part of the tone of the second half of the movie." Griffith was initially reluctant to take the role, thinking she "didn't want any more nymphet roles, but now I think I can bring a lot of life to that kind of character...I think I gave her a great amount of intelligence."

De Palma considered Dutch erotic actress Sylvia Kristel for the role of Gloria Revelle, but she was unavailable. Although he cast Deborah Shelton, he found her voice to be unsuitable and had her lines dubbed by Helen Shaver in post-production.

Body Double contains a film within a film sequence in which pop band Frankie Goes to Hollywood performs their song "Relax" on the set of a pornographic film, and in which scream queen Brinke Stevens and adult actresses Cara Lott and Annette Haven appear. The club scene was converted into a music video and shown on MTV. Voice actor Rob Paulsen has a bit role as a cameraman who utters "Where's the cum shot?".

=== Filming ===
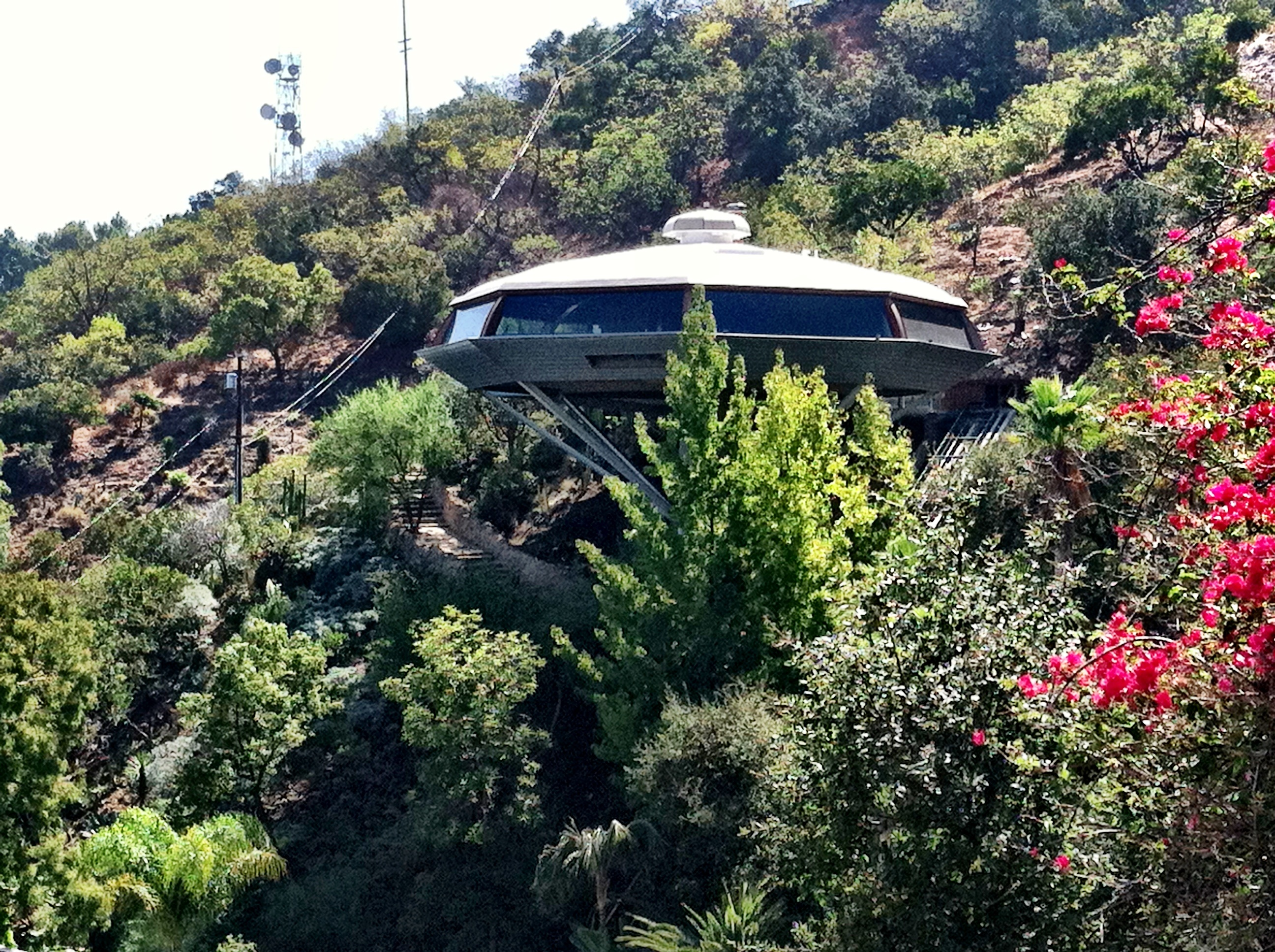
Chemosphere, the ultramodern house used in Body Double

Principal photography began in Los Angeles on February 21, 1984. Several locations in and around the area were used, including: Tail o' the Pup, the Beverly Center, Barney's Beanery, the LA Farmer's Market, the Rodeo Collection mall on Rodeo Drive, the Spruce Goose dome, the Beach Terrace Motel in Long Beach, the Hollywood Tower and adjacent Hollywood Freeway, Tower Records and the Chemosphere house.

=== Post-production ===
The film was initially given an X by the Motion Picture Association of America ratings board. Because many theaters refused to show X-rated films, De Palma had to re-edit the film as he did on Dressed to Kill and Scarface. De Palma cut what he called "a few minor things from the porno movie scene" and secured an R rating. De Palma said Columbia did not support the film due to its excessive violence. He said, "Do you think the guys who run Coca-Cola (Columbia Pictures' parent company) want publicity about violence? They are very aware of their public images, and when they start seeing articles in The New York Times about their product and violence, they go crazy. They're not showmen. They're corporation types."

== Themes ==
=== Artifice and illusion ===
De Palma said the film deals with themes previously explored in his other films: "visualistic storytelling, a kind of obsessional voyeuristic activity, a sense of humor about the world we live in, manipulators manipulating manipulators". The theme of artifice is demonstrated through Body Double's Hollywood setting—a location itself understood to be in the business of "make-believe"—characters, and plot. The title refers to the filmmaking term for a person who substitutes for another actor in scenes where the face is not shown, but it also acquires a second literal meaning in the film as the audience, along with Jake Scully (Craig Wasson), is presented with situations intended to deceive. The theme is also exhibited in multiple plot lines throughout, such as Jake's belief that it is Gloria he is spying on, Jake disguising himself in order to infiltrate the pornographic film shoot, and the reveal of the killer's identity.

Numerous scenes call attention to their own artificiality and the film's construction, from the opening scene of a desert where the camera then pulls away to reveal the desert is in fact a painted backdrop on the set of a B movie. Critics noted that with this scene, "De Palma puts us on edge from the start...repeatedly revealing in the first few minutes that what we're seeing isn't real — it's all a calculated illusion intended to trick us."

Jake goes undercover on the set of Holly Does Hollywood in a film within a film sequence. In the scene, Frankie Goes to Hollywood performs the song "Relax".

De Palma also makes use of rear projection techniques to emphasize artificialness. Rear projection is used in scenes where Jake drives around Los Angeles following Gloria. The scene of Jake's kiss with Gloria in front of the tunnel uses rear projection and functions as a direct reference to Alfred Hitchcock's Vertigo with its 360-degree camera shot.

The scene on the porn film set soundtracked to Frankie Goes to Hollywood's song "Relax" is referred to by critics as "exhilarating" for its staging and metatextuality. Filmed in one long unbroken take, the scene segues into a musical sequence without warning and prompts viewers to question whether the action is happening in the porn film itself or the larger world of Body Double.

Manuela Lazic of The Film Stage noted that the scene has "Jake [playing] a parody of his nebbish self accompanied physically and musically by Frankie Goes to Hollywood", and that "the director presents a need to 'fake it 'til you make it' as absolute and inescapable. It is telling of De Palma's joyful cynicism that this scene, an apotheosis of fakery and eroticism, is probably Body Double's most memorable." For the sequence, De Palma allowed his actual camera crew to be visible in shots, further blurring the lines between the film itself and the film Holly Body is making.

Body Double also explores the difference between fantasy and reality as Jake becomes drawn to who he thinks is Gloria dancing in the window. As a voyeur, he attaches a fantasy to her without ever interacting with her in person. When Jake becomes compelled to follow Gloria, she becomes a flesh and blood person to him, more than an object of his fantasies. On a more heightened level, when Jake has his first conversation with Holly after the filming of the porn movie, he is taken aback by her straightforwardness and assertiveness. Holly, "a woman with agency, in full command of her body, career, and sexuality...[appears to be] a rebuke of the illusion Jake held of the leering, lip-licking porn star in Holly Does Hollywood".

De Palma has commented on the deliberate mixing of illusion and reality, saying "It [the film] constantly plays with that. But even though there are great shifts in form, it never really alienates the audience, which is an accomplishment, I feel."

=== Voyeurism and exhibitionism ===
As in his previous films such as Greetings, Hi, Mom!, Dressed to Kill and Blow Out, De Palma addresses the theme of voyeurism. Critics noted that the act of voyeurism can provide an "illusory, imaginative form of control", a feeling Jake has lost due to his demoted, emasculated position. With Body Double, voyeurism becomes tied to exhibitionism, and is used to reflect back on the viewer. Jake, a voyeur who "likes to watch", is understood to be a stand-in for the audience. Voyeurism is turned on its head as it is intimated early on that the woman Jake is peeping on knows her nightly dances are being watched, and with the eventual reveal that the routine is in fact a hired performance.

The scene of Jake first encountering Holly on the set of Holly Does Hollywood is understood to be a commentary on the male gaze. Jake spies Holly in a hallway mirror reflection; as he approaches her, a bathroom mirror captures Jake looking at Holly; thus, the audience is watching Jake watch Holly, who in turn is performing for the porn film and is aware of Jake's presence.

Critic David Denby observed: "Body Double is about Los Angeles, about the eroticized way of life, partly created by the media culture, in which exhibitionist and voyeur are linked by common need. The people live in houses with huge windows; they cruise one another insolently, unafraid of being watched as they watch; privacy is meaningless—there is only the sexiness of endless scrutiny and quick encounter."

=== Satire of Hollywood ===
Jake and Gloria kiss as the background shows a noticeable rear projection. The scene is a direct homage to a 360-degree camera shot in Alfred Hitchcock's film Vertigo.

Marylynn Uricchio of the Pittsburgh Post-Gazette wrote, "De Palma throws in elements of satire and more than nods his head at the whole Hollywood tradition. There's that sweepy, heavy-handed score by Pino Donaggio that punctuates the action with a snide smile. And there's that 360-degree kiss scene, straight out of Hitchcock, with the highly colored backgrounds of the old Technicolor films." Griffith stated Body Double "is a parody of Hollywood more than anything". Some critics opined that the character of The Indian, with his garish makeup, is a reference to the old Hollywood practice of using redface to depict Native American characters.

Critics have also pointed out that the film's juxtaposition of mainstream Hollywood filmmaking with pornography illustrates that "mainstream films use sex and sexuality in the same manner as exploitation films." By blurring the boundaries between mainstream filmmaking and pornography and showing how illusionism is present in both, Body Double knowingly satirizes the world of Hollywood and its pretenses that it is more "legitimate" than the adult film world.

== Release ==
The film was previewed for Columbia Pictures executives in Van Nuys ahead of its general release. De Palma says that Columbia was enthusiastic about the film until the screening. Response from the audience was not strong "and the studio started to get really worried," he said. "The only people crazier than the people who criticize me for violence are the people at the studios. I can't stand that sort of cowardice." De Palma and Columbia mutually agreed to end the three-picture deal.

=== Box office ===
Body Double was released theatrically in the United States on October 26, 1984, the same day as The Terminator. It opened at number three at the box office, earning $2.8 million in its opening weekend. The film earned $8.2 million over its first three weeks, before being pulled in its fourth week. The film earned $8.8 million on a $10 million budget, making it a box office bomb.

== Reception ==
Body Double debuted to a divided response; positive reviews praised the visual style and the performances, while negative reviews criticized the plot, described the Hitchcock homages as derivative, and lambasted the sex and violence as vulgar. Audiences polled by CinemaScore gave the film an average grade of "D+" on an A+ to F scale. Roger Ebert praised the film, giving it three and a half out of four stars and calling it "an exhilarating exercise in pure filmmaking, a thriller in the Hitchcock tradition in which there's no particular point except that the hero is flawed, weak, and in terrible danger – and we identify with him completely."

Vincent Canby of The New York Times wrote that De Palma "again goes too far, which is the reason to see it. It's sexy and explicitly crude, entertaining and sometimes very funny. It's his most blatant variation to date on a Hitchcock film (Vertigo), but it's also a De Palma original, a movie that might have offended Hitchcock's wryly avuncular public personality, while appealing to his darker, most private fantasies." Writing for The Day, Paul Baumann said, "This is one movie that can make the horrific fascinating and still underline, in a hilarious way, the absurdity of it all." The Schenectady Gazette's Dan DiNicola wrote, "I could not resist [the film's] visual brilliance which without malice or cynicism holds up a mirror to the 'nature' of millions of American viewers."

Griffith received critical acclaim for her performance, with Canby commenting she "gives a perfectly controlled comic performance that successfully neutralizes all questions relating to plausibility. She's not exactly new to films, having played in Night Moves, Smile and The Drowning Pool as a very young actress. What is new is the self-assured screen presence she demonstrates here, and it's one of the delights of Body Double." Baumann wrote Holly's "wildly incongruous conversations with the earnest Jake get funnier and funnier as the real danger gets closer and closer" and that De Palma can turn "[Griffith's] caustic hectoring of motorists...into a charmed bit of pathos".

Todd McCarthy of Variety stated, "To his credit, DePalma moves his camera as beautifully as any director in the business today and on a purely physical level Body Double often proves quite seductive as the camera tracks, swirls, cranes and zooms towards and around the objects of De Palma's usually sinister contemplation. Unfortunately, most of the film consists of visual riffs on Alfred Hitchcock, particularly Vertigo and Rear Window." David Denby of New York gave a mixed review, but raved about De Palma's "gliding, sensual trancelike style that is the most sheerly pleasurable achievement in contemporary movies." Denby singled out the scene set at the Rodeo Collection mall, writing "virtually wordless, this sustained episode accumulates a kind of suspense that is as much moral and psychological as physical".

Paul Attanasio of The Washington Post positively reviewed the film, writing, "A lewd, gory, twisty-turny murder mystery swirling around Hollywood's porn industry, Body Double finds Brian De Palma at the zenith of his cinematic virtuosity. The movie has been carefully calculated to offend almost everyone—and probably will. But, like Hitchcock, De Palma makes the audience's reaction the real subject; Body Double is about the dark longings deep inside us."

Negative reviews opined De Palma was returning to familiar territory by riffing on Hitchcock. In The New Yorker, Pauline Kael shared "the big, showy scenes recall Vertigo and Rear Window so obviously that the movie is like an assault on the people who have put De Palma down for being derivative. This time, he's just about spiting himself and giving them reasons not to like him. And these big scenes have no special point, other than their resemblance to Hitchcock's work." Sheila Benson of the Los Angeles Times panned the film as "elaborately empty" and "silly", suggesting that De Palma "finally may have exhausted the patience of even his most tenacious admirers." Kael added that "the voyeuristic sequences, with Wasson peeping through a telescope, aren't particularly erotic; De Palma shows more sexual feeling for the swank buildings and real estate."

Some also claimed the plot is ultimately given less importance than the film's visuals. TV Guide wrote, "Contrived, shallow, distasteful, and ultimately pointless, Body Double is more an exercise in empty cinematic style than an engrossing thriller. Although cinematographer Burum executes some absolutely breathtaking camera moves, his effort goes for naught when pitted against director De Palma and cowriter Avrech's insipid narrative." Rita Kempley of The Washington Post described the film as a horror comedy, but said it comes off as "sadistic" and does not find a balance "between the comic and the macabre".

The film was criticized for a violent scene involving a woman that some described as an example of sexualized violence. In the scene, the woman is killed by a power drill; though the drill is never shown entering the victim's body, it is suggestively framed as a phallus. In a review that awarded two-and-a-half stars out of four, Gene Siskel of the Chicago Tribune wrote, "When the drill came onto the screen, De Palma lost me and control of his movie. At that point Body Double ceased to be a homage to Hitchcock and instead became a cheap splatter film, and not a very good one at that." In contrast, David Denby noted the film's "violence is so outlandish that only the literal-minded should be able to take it seriously", and argued that its gaudiness appears to address De Palma's detractors "who talk of violence in his films as if it were the real thing", or those who cannot distinguish between the image and actual violence.

The London Clinic for Battered Women asked Columbia Pictures for a percentage of the profits from the film, claiming it was "blood money" for using "the victimization of women as a source of massive profit." In response to the criticism, De Palma said it "was not [his] intention to create a sexual image with the drill, although it could be construed that way." He added, "Women in peril work better in the suspense genre. It all goes back to the Perils of Pauline...I don't think morality applies to art. It's a ludicrous idea. I mean, what is the morality of a still life? I don't think there's good or bad fruit in the bowl."

=== Awards and nominations ===
Award	Category	Nominee	Result	Ref.
Golden Globe Awards	Best Supporting Actress – Motion Picture	Melanie Griffith	Nominated	
National Society of Film Critics Awards	Best Supporting Actress	Melanie Griffith	Won	
New York Film Critics Circle Awards	Best Supporting Actress	Melanie Griffith	2nd place	
Clio Awards	Award for teaser trailer		Won	
Golden Raspberry Awards	Worst Director	Brian De Palma	Nominated	

== Cult reputation and reassessed response ==
In following decades, Body Double underwent a critical reassessment and developed a cult following, with critics citing its directorial and aesthetic indulgences, its early 1980s new wave soundtrack, homages to Alfred Hitchcock, and the use of iconic Los Angeles locations. Critic Sean Axmaker said that with distance, the film can more easily be seen as a satire of the 1980s era of excess and an image-obsessed culture.

Writing of the 2013 Blu-ray release of the film, Chuck Bowen of Slant Magazine said, "Body Double's consciously derivative thriller plot is as dense with meta-text as any film in De Palma's career; the searing personal material, which has been buried underneath the film's superficial happenings with precision and élan, must be discovered with the eyes." Critic Christy Lemire wrote, "What's real, what's imagined and what's movie magic remain mysteries until the end. But the winding road through the hills to get there is always a wind-in-your-hair thrill."

Critics have also commented on how the second half of the film is a subversive commentary on the first part. In an essay for Bright Wall/Dark Room magazine, Travis Woods wrote, "just as the film's reflexive second hour is De Palma's counter-critique to his critics, it is also a gear-shift into Holly's world, a nightscape L.A. wherein De Palma subverts the tropes he littered throughout the film's first half by employing the postmodern grimy-sticky grit of VHS porn, MTV-styled music video theatrics, and the twisting of a traditional hero's journey dropped into the duplicitous hell of Me-Decade Hollywood."

On the film's finale, Bowen added: "De Palma pulls the entire rug out from underneath the film's reality and turns everything we've just seen into a prolonged Brechtian shaggy-dog joke, only to then pull the rug out from under that joke and halfheartedly reaffirm the film's reality as a mystery-thriller. By the end of this masterpiece, one of the great and most uniquely American films of the 1980s, we only trust surfaces, which are as fleeting and illusory as anything else."

Griffith's and Wasson's performances have also been the focus of praise. Lemire wrote, "The scene in [Holly] explains to [Jake] what she will and will not do on camera is a perfect encapsulation of Griffith's charm. She's girlishly angelic but also startlingly no-nonsense. She's a much smarter cookie than she gets credit for being and her comic timing is slyly perfect." Manuela Lazic of The Film Stage said, "As central character Jake Scully, Wasson turns his conventionally attractive looks into an endlessly fascinating nebbishness and awkwardness. In an early scene, Jake simply walks to his car and jumps in the driver's seat, yet Wasson manages to turn this casual action into one of the most amusing instances of purposefully bad acting." Griffith later gave credit to the film and the accolades she garnered for her performance for helping to relaunch her film career after a brief absence.

On the review aggregator website Rotten Tomatoes, 78% of 41 critics' reviews are positive. The website's consensus reads: "Exemplifying Brian De Palma's filmmaking bravura and polarizing taste, Body Double is a salacious love letter to moviemaking." Metacritic, which uses a weighted average, assigned the film a score of 69 out of 100, based on 18 critics, indicating "generally favorable" reviews.

In a 2016 interview with The Guardian, De Palma reflected on the film's initial critical reception, saying "Body Double was reviled when it came out. Reviled. It really hurt. I got slaughtered by the press right at the height of the women's liberation movement...I thought it was completely unjustified. It was a suspense thriller, and I was always interested in finding new ways to kill people." The film helped reintroduce the song "Relax" in America, where it recharted and reached the top 10 of the Billboard Hot 100 in March 1985.

Additionally, Mark Olsen of the Los Angeles Times named Body Double as one of De Palma's "underrated gems" of the 1980s, stating, "Even more than Dressed to Kill or Blow Out, for me Body Double is the most quintessentially Brian De Palma movie of what might be thought of as his 'high period' – that late-'70s, early-'80s moment when he was making relatively high-budget, high-profile movies that culminated in The Untouchables." In 2023, IndieWire listed Body Double as number 30 on their list of "The 100 Best Movies of the '80s".

== Home media ==
Body Double was first released on DVD in 1998 with widescreen and pan and scan formats. On October 3, 2006, the film was released as a Special Edition DVD by Sony Pictures . The DVD included the featurettes "The Seduction", "The Setup", "The Mystery" and "The Controversy", all of which cover different aspects of the production and contain interviews with De Palma, Griffith, Shelton and Gregg Henry.

On August 13, 2013, the film was released to Blu-ray by Twilight Time. Special features from the 2006 DVD were ported over. On October 24, 2016, the film was re-released as a limited edition Blu-ray from Indicator Series. It included previously released features as well as an interview with Craig Wasson, the documentary Pure Cinema from first assistant director Joe Napolitano, and an illustrated booklet containing an essay by film critic Ashley Clark, a Film Comment interview of De Palma in 1984 by journalist Marcia Pally, and an article from a May 1987 issue of Film Comment in which De Palma gives a personal guide of his favorite films.

== In popular culture ==
The 1989 black comedy film Vampire's Kiss takes its title from the B-movie Jake Scully acts in. The 1991 Bret Easton Ellis novel American Psycho repeatedly refers to Body Double as the favorite film of serial killer Patrick Bateman because of the power drill scene. Bateman mentions that he has seen the film 37 times and rents the tape of it from a video store several times in the story.

Pop singer Slayyyter cited Body Double as an influence on her 2023 album Starfucker. The cover for her single "Erotic Electronic" is a visual reference to the film's poster. The 2024 Ti West horror film MaXXXine contains several visual and thematic references to Body Double.

== Remake ==
Body Double was remade in 1993 in India as Pehla Nasha. The film was directed by Ashutosh Gowariker in his directorial debut. Deepak Tijori plays the lead role and the film features Pooja Bhatt, Raveena Tandon and Paresh Rawal.

== See also ==
- List of films featuring surveillance
- List of American films of 1984

== Bibliography ==
- Bouzereau, Laurent (1988). The De Palma Cut: The Films of America's Most Controversial Director. New York: Dembner Books. pp. 113-119. ISBN 978-0942637045.
- Denby, David (November 5, 1984). "The Woman in the Window". New York. pp. 67–69.
