= Mainichi Film Award for Foreign Film Best One Award =

Award given annually at the Mainichi Film Awards

- Awarded for: Best foreign film of the year
- Country: Japan
- First award: 1984
- Currently held by: Oppenheimer (2024)
- Website: mainichi.jp/mfa/

The Mainichi Film Award for Foreign Film Best One Award (毎日映画コンクール外国映画ベストワン賞), also known as Mainichi Film Award for Best Foreign Film, is an award given annually at the Mainichi Film Awards to recognize the best foreign films produced outside Japan. It was first presented in 1984, with Sophie's Choice being the first recipient of the award.

== Winners ==
=== 1980s ===
Year	Title	Country
1983	Sophie's Choice	United States
1984	The Dresser	United Kingdom
1985	A Sunday in the Country	France
1986	The Purple Rose of Cairo	United States
1987	The Trip to Bountiful	United States
1988	Hope and Glory	United Kingdom, United States
1989	Cinema Paradiso	Italy, France

=== 1990s ===
Year	Title	Country
1990	A City of Sadness	Taiwan
1991	Dances with Wolves	United States
1992	JFK	United States
1993	Unforgiven	United States
1994	Farewell My Concubine	Hong Kong
1995	The Shawshank Redemption	United States
1996	Ulysses' Gaze	Greece
1997	The English Patient	United States, United Kingdom
1998	L.A. Confidential	United States
1999	Shakespeare in Love	United States, United Kingdom

=== 2000s ===
Year	Title	Country
2000	Space Cowboys	United States
2001	Postmen in the Mountains	China
2002	Devils on the Doorstep	China
2003	The Pianist	France, Germany, Poland, United Kingdom
2004	Mystic River	United States
2005	Not awarded	
2006	Flags of Our Fathers	United States
2007	Still Life	China
2008	The Dark Knight	United States, United Kingdom
2009	Gran Torino	United States

=== 2010s ===
Year	Title	Country
2010	Breathless	South Korea
2011	The King's Speech	United Kingdom, Australia
2012	Hugo	United States
2013	Amour	France, Austria, Germany
2014	Boyhood	United States
2015	Birdman	United States
2016	Sully	United States
2017	I, Daniel Blake	United Kingdom, France
2018	Three Billboards Outside Ebbing, Missouri	United States, United Kingdom
2019	Joker	United States

=== 2020s ===
Year	Title	Country
2020	Parasite	South Korea
2021	Nomadland	United States
2022	Belfast	United Kingdom
2023	Tár	United States / Germany
2024	Oppenheimer	United States
2025	One Battle After Another	United States
