= Louis Ducreux =

French actor, screenwriter and composer (1911–1992)

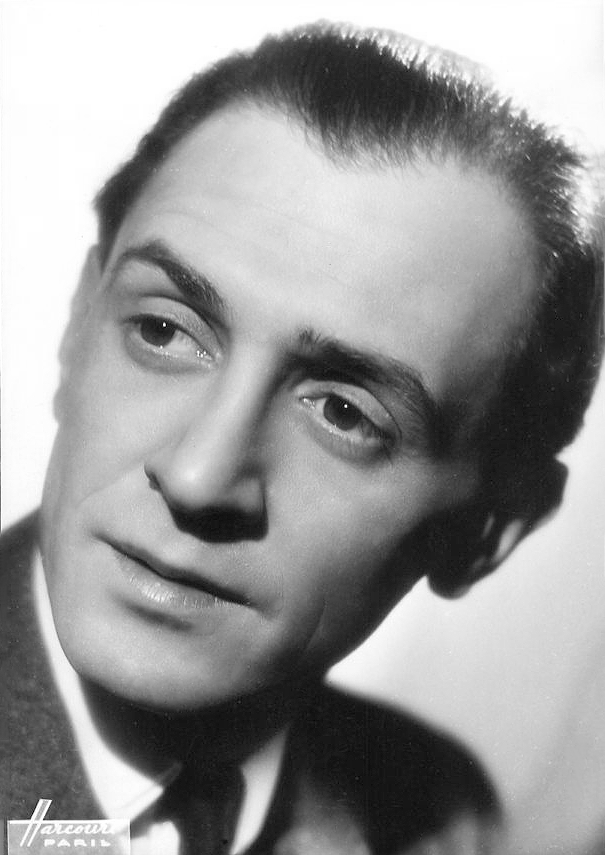
- Louis Ducreux in 1938
- Born: 22 September 1911; Marseille, France
- Died: 19 December 1992 (aged 81); Paris, France
- Occupation(s): Actor, screenwriter and composer
- Years active: 1938–1993

Louis Ducreux (22 September 1911 – 19 December 1992) was a French actor, screenwriter and composer.

He was born Louis Raymond Bordat in Marseille, France. He made his film debut in 1938 and worked until his death. He received a Best Actor nomination at the César Awards in 1985 for Bertrand Tavernier's A Sunday in the Country. He also worked on Max Ophüls's La Ronde as a lyricist, writing the title theme "La ronde de l'amour". Ducreux died in Paris at the age of 81.

== Filmography ==
Year	Title	Role	Notes
1938	Heartbeat		Uncredited
1939	The World Will Shake		
1948	Une grande fille toute simple		
1958	Le désordre et la nuit	Henri Marken	
1984	A Sunday in the Country	Monsieur Ladmiral	
1988	Zoo	Il vecchio guardiano / Le vieux gardien	
1989	3615 code Père Noël	Papy	
1990	Daddy Nostalgie	Mr. Metro	
1991	The Double Life of Veronique	Le professeur	
1993	Mensonge	Grand-père	(final film role)
