= A Sunday in the Country =

1984 film by Bertrand Tavernier

- French: Un dimanche à la campagne
- Directed by: Bertrand Tavernier
- Written by: Colo Tavernier; Bertrand Tavernier
- Based on: Monsieur Ladmiral va bientôt mourir by Pierre Bost
- Produced by: Alain Sarde; Bertrand Tavernier
- Starring: Louis Ducreux; Michel Aumont; Sabine Azéma; Geneviève Mnich; Monique Chaumette
- Cinematography: Bruno de Keyzer
- Edited by: Armand Psenny
- Production companies: Sara Films; Films A2; Little Bear
- Distributed by: AMLF
- Release date: 11 April 1984
- Running time: 90 minutes
- Country: France
- Language: French
- Box office: 2.4 million

A Sunday in the Country (French: Un Dimanche à la Campagne) is a 1984 French drama film directed, co-written, and co-produced by Bertrand Tavernier, based on Pierre Bost's 1945 novel Monsieur Ladmiral va bientôt mourir. The film stars Louis Ducreux, Michel Aumont, Sabine Azéma, Geneviève Mnich, and Monique Chaumette. It explores family dynamics in a clan on the eve of World War I.

The film was theatrically released in France on 11 April 1984, and was selected to compete for the Palme d'Or in the main competition section at the 37th Cannes Film Festival, where Tavernier was awarded Best Director. It received generally positive reviews from critics. The film won Best Actress for Azéma, Best Adapted Screenplay, and Best Cinematography from a total of eight nominations, including Best Film, at the 10th César Awards. It was nominated for Best Foreign Language Film at the 42nd Golden Globe Awards and the 38th British Academy Film Awards.

== Plot ==
The story takes place during a Sunday in the late summer of 1912. Monsieur Ladmiral is a painter without any real genius and in the twilight of his life. Since the death of his wife, he lives alone with Mercedes, his servant. As every Sunday, he invites Edouard (whose wife makes him go by that name, instead of "Gonzague"), his son, a steady young man, who likes order and propriety, accompanied by his wife, Marie-Thérèse and their three children, Emile, Lucien and Mireille. Later that day, Irène, Gonzague's sister, a young non-conformist, liberated and energetic woman, upsets this peaceful ritual. While loving and mostly respectful of Ladmiral, she does not think too highly of most of her father's art.

== Cast ==
- Louis Ducreux as Monsieur Ladmiral
- Michel Aumont as Edouard/Gonzague
- Sabine Azéma as Irène
- Geneviève Mnich as Marie-Thérèse
- Monique Chaumette as Mercédès
- Thomas Duval as Emile
- Quentin Ogier as Lucien
- Katia Wostrikoff as Mireille
- Claude Winter as Madame Ladmiral
- Jean-Roger Milo as Fisherman (Le pêcheur)
- Pascale Vignal as A servant (La serveuse)
- Jacques Poitrenaud as Hector (Patron guinguette)
- Valentine Suard as Little girl (La petite fille 1)
- Erika Faivre as Little girl (La petite fille 2)
- Marc Perrone as Accordionist (L'accordéoniste)
- Bertrand Tavernier as the narrator (uncredited)

== Reception ==
=== Critical response ===
On the review aggregator website Rotten Tomatoes, the film has an approval rating of 100% based on 7 reviews, with an average rating of 8.4/10. Janet Maslin of The New York Times wrote that "A Sunday in the Country is exquisite - purposefully and almost painfully so - from beginning to end" and stated it "is one of the director's very best films, acted as beautifully and thoughtfully as it is staged." Paul Attanasio of The Washington Post described it as "a glistening, ornately constructed movie in which everything's of a piece" and said that "what's extraordinary about A Sunday in the Country is the way Tavernier, with a few strokes, limns nuanced, authentic characters." Sheila Benson of the Los Angeles Times called the film "moving and masterly" and commented that "a felicity and intelligence infuse every particle of the film, its clothes, its art direction, editing, photography and music. The actors are superb." Roger Ebert gave the film 4 out of 4 stars, feeling Tavernier's story was "graceful and delicate" and wrote that "A Sunday in the Country has a haunting, sweet, sad quality. It is about this family, and many families. It is told by Tavernier with great attention to detail, and the details add up to the way life is."

=== Accolades ===
Year	Award	Category	Recipient	Result
1984	Cannes Film Festival	Best Director	Bertrand Tavernier	Won
1984	National Board of Review Awards	Best Supporting Actress	Sabine Azéma	Won
1984	National Board of Review Awards	Best Foreign Language Film	A Sunday in the Country	Won
1984	National Board of Review Awards	Top Five Foreign Language Films	A Sunday in the Country	Won
1984	Kansas City Film Critics Circle Awards	Best Foreign Film	A Sunday in the Country	Won
1985	National Society of Film Critics Awards	Best Picture	A Sunday in the Country	Runner-up
1985	National Society of Film Critics Awards	Best Director	Bertrand Tavernier	Runner-up
1985	National Society of Film Critics Awards	Best Screenplay	Colo Tavernier; Bertrand Tavernier	Runner-up
1985	Boston Society of Film Critics Awards	Best Director	Bertrand Tavernier	Won
1985	Boston Society of Film Critics Awards	Best Foreign Language Film	A Sunday in the Country	Won
1985	London Film Critics' Circle Awards	Foreign Language Film of the Year	A Sunday in the Country	Won
1985	New York Film Critics Circle Awards	Best Director	Bertrand Tavernier	Runner-up
1985	New York Film Critics Circle Awards	Best Foreign Language Film	A Sunday in the Country	Won
1985	Golden Globe Awards	Best Foreign Film	A Sunday in the Country	Nominated
1985	César Awards	Best Film	A Sunday in the Country	Nominated
1985	César Awards	Best Actor	Louis Ducreux	Nominated
1985	César Awards	Best Actress	Sabine Azéma	Won
1985	César Awards	Best Supporting Actor	Michel Aumont	Nominated
1985	César Awards	Best Director	Bertrand Tavernier	Nominated
1985	César Awards	Best Adapted Screenplay	Colo Tavernier; Bertrand Tavernier	Won
1985	César Awards	Best Cinematography	Bruno de Keyzer	Won
1985	César Awards	Best Editing	Armand Psenny	Nominated
1985	British Academy Film Awards	Best Foreign Language Film	A Sunday in the Country	Nominated
1986	Mainichi Film Awards	Best Foreign Language Film	A Sunday in the Country	Won

== Music ==
The sound track features excerpts from Gabriel Fauré chamber works: the third movement of the String Quartet in E Minor, Op. 121, second movement of the Piano Trio in D minor, Op. 120, and first movement of the Piano Quintet No. 2 in C minor, Op. 115.
