= San José de Vista Hermosa Hacienda =

Hacienda in Morelos

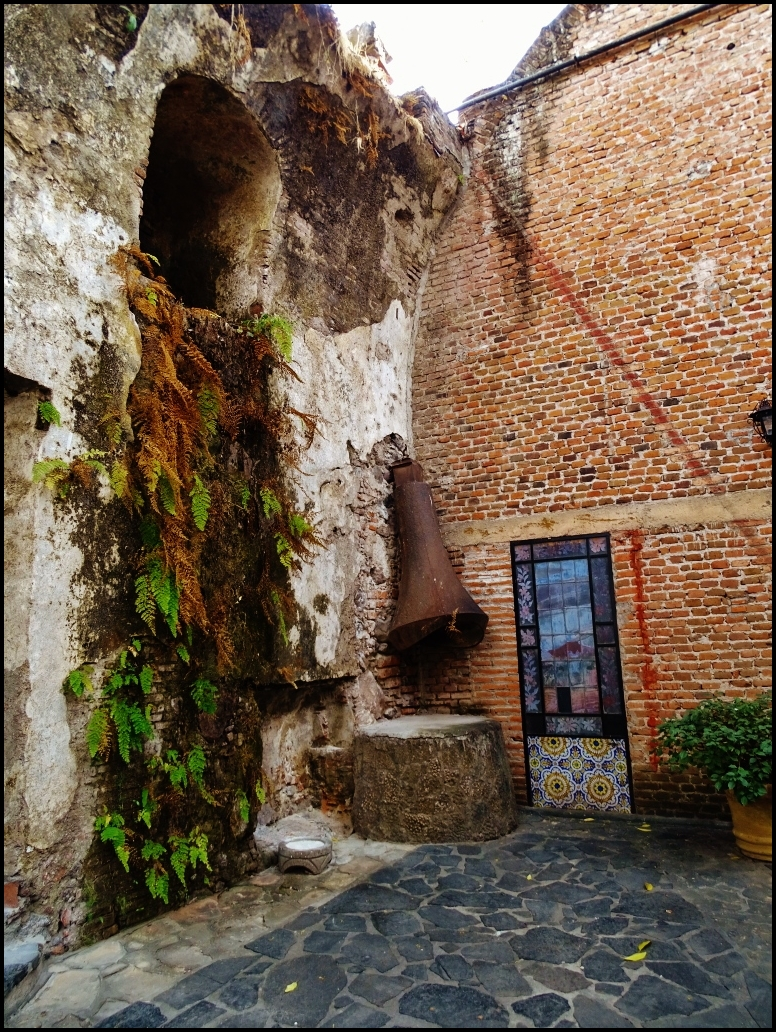
Exterior view of one of the chapels at the San José de Vista Hermosa Hacienda

The San José de Vista Hermosa Hacienda is a stretch of land situated in the municipality of Puente de Ixtla, in the state of Morelos, Mexico, just 3 kilometres (1.9 mi) from the Tequesquitengo Lake. Although the place is currently known as a hacienda, due to its growth and multiple expansions over the years, it was originally founded as a sugar mill belonging to the Temixco Hacienda.

The 18,000 hectares (44,000 acres) property, founded in 1529, is one of the oldest haciendas in the area. The land follows the typical structure of a colonial Hacienda, including residential and production areas, a Catholic chapel, stables, orchards, a bakery, and underground dungeons used to hold enslaved prisoners.

The hacienda is currently open to the public as a luxury hotel, restaurant, and museum, and is a popular tourist attraction in the state of Morelos.

== History ==
The hacienda was founded in the year 1529 by Hernán Cortés, Captain General of the New Spain Kingdom during the time of Spanish occupation in Mexico, who received the rights to the land from King Charles V as a reward for his work in the colonization. The land belonged to the descendants of Hernán Cortés until 1921.

In the following centuries, the land was passed through different owners, and the infrastructure grew as an agro-industrial center primarily dedicated to the extraction and production of sugar, alcohol, and grains.

During the Mexican Revolution, the property was occupied by the Zapatista forces. After the end of the revolution, following the death of Emiliano Zapata, the lands of the state of Morelos were distributed among the local farmers, and the San José de Vista Hermosa Hacienda was left abandoned and reduced to rubble. Only 8 hectares (20 acres) of land, including the gardens and central structures, were left without any major damage.

At the end of the 20th century, after the structure had been abandoned for nearly half a century, Fernando Martínez and Fernando González, private investors, acquired the ruined property, renovated it, and opened the space to the public.

== Tourist attraction ==
Currently, the San José de Vista Hermosa Hacienda operates as a hotel, museum, and restaurant for tourists visiting Morelos. Despite the multiple restorations, the site still preserves its original historical and architectural elements, such as arches, walls, fountains, bedrooms, etc., now integrated as part of its tourist design.
