= All of Me (1984 film) =

American film by Carl Reiner

- Theatrical release poster
- Directed by: Carl Reiner
- Screenplay by: Phil Alden Robinson
- Adaptation by: Henry Olek
- Based on: Me Two unpublished novel by Edwin Davis
- Produced by: Stephen Friedman
- Starring: Steve Martin; Lily Tomlin; Richard Libertini; Victoria Tennant
- Cinematography: Richard H. Kline
- Edited by: Bud Molin
- Music by: Patrick Williams
- Production company: Kings Road Entertainment
- Distributed by: Universal Pictures
- Release date: September 21, 1984
- Running time: 93 minutes
- Country: United States
- Language: English
- Box office: $36.4 million

All of Me is a 1984 American fantasy comedy film directed by Carl Reiner and starring Steve Martin and Lily Tomlin. It is based on the unpublished novel Me Two by Edwin Davis. The title song and theme of the film is the 1931 jazz standard "All of Me".

== Plot ==
In Los Angeles, dissatisfied 38-year-old attorney and aspiring jazz guitarist Roger Cobb is dating his boss' daughter. When Roger asks his boss, Burton Schuyler, for more serious cases, Burton places him in charge of managing the affairs of Edwina Cutwater, a stubborn and eccentric millionairess who is dying. At the Cutwater estate, Edwina tells Roger she plans to leave her entire estate to her stableman's young daughter, Terry Hoskins. Edwina, who has been bedridden since childhood, has enlisted Tibetan swami Prahka Lasa to transfer her soul into Terry's body using a sacred bowl, hoping for another chance to enjoy her wealth, while Terry's soul will become one with the universe. Roger questions Edwina's sanity.

Edwina dies at the law office, and Prahka transfers her soul into the bowl, which is accidentally knocked out the window and falls on Roger's head. Roger realizes that Edwina's soul has entered his body, with Roger controlling the left side and Edwina the right. She causes him to lose both his girlfriend and his job. Besides hearing her thoughts, Roger talks to Edwina's image that appears in mirrors and other reflective surfaces. Their relationship gradually warms up, but both of them want Edwina out of his body.

After Roger tells Terry that Edwina's soul has entered his body instead, Terry asks Roger for a last night of passion before her soul leaves her body, so they return to his apartment while Edwina is asleep inside his mind. Just as Roger and Terry are about to have sex, Edwina wakes up, appalled by their lust since she is a virgin, and Terry leaves. Realizing that the soul transference really works, Terry sends Prahka to the airport with a plane ticket to Tibet. In Prahka's hotel room, Roger and Terry try to have sex again until the swami unexpectedly returns. Terry admits to Roger that she never intended to go through with the transference and was only after Edwina's fortune.

Roger pledges to help transfer Edwina's soul into Terry's body with Prahka's help. They, along with Tyrone Wattell, Roger's blind friend and fellow musician, pose as band members and sneak into Terry's party at her newly inherited mansion. Prahka transfers Edwina's soul back into the bowl, but when Roger attempts to force Terry to touch the bowl, it is flung into a bucket of water, transferring Edwina into the liquid. Prahka explains that he must repair the dented bowl before her soul can be transferred again. Terry sends two security guards after Roger and the bucket. Roger flees and pours the water into a pitcher, which he gives to Tyrone for safekeeping.

Roger allows himself to be caught with the bucket, which he has filled with regular water. Terry, however, appears with the pitcher, which she empties into a flower bed. Believing Edwina to be lost forever, Roger despondently wanders around the mansion as the party continues into the night. Reuniting with Tyrone, Roger discovers that his friend, mistaking the water for gin, had drunk from the pitcher before Terry took it, thereby transferring Edwina into his own body. Prahka, having repaired the bowl, sends Edwina's soul back into Roger.

Roger, Prahka, and Tyrone sneak into Terry's bedroom to attempt another transference, but she holds them at gunpoint as she intends to kill Roger and pass him off as an intruder. Terry leads the trio to a guest room, where Terry is surprised to find his boss Burton with his lover. Roger wrestles the gun from Terry, and as Burton threatens to call the police, Terry offers Roger a deal, not wanting to return to prison since this would be her third conviction.

In the morning, Prahka transfers Terry's soul into her favorite horse and Edwina's soul into Terry's body. Roger tells Edwina that he has given up law to be a musician, and he teaches her how to dance.

== Cast ==
- Steve Martin as Roger Cobb
- Lily Tomlin as Edwina Cutwater
- Victoria Tennant as Terry Hoskins
- Madolyn Smith as Peggy Schuyler
- Richard Libertini as Prahka Lasa
- Dana Elcar as Burton Schuyler, Roger's boss
- Jason Bernard as Tyrone Wattell, Roger's blind musician friend
- Selma Diamond as Margo, Roger's secretary
- Eric Christmas as Fred Hoskins, Terry's father
- Gailard Sartain as Fulton Norris
- Neva Patterson as Gretchen
- Michael Ensign as Mr. Mifflin
- Peggy Feury as Dr. Betty Ahrens

In an interview, Martin described his sense of his character Roger Cobb: "This man is not an idiot. He is a contemporary person with some brains, [...] he's not naive or a victim of circumstances. He's an intelligent man who happens to get caught in a disaster. That's a big difference between this role and any other part I've played. [...] For the first time I'm in a story with a beginning, middle, and end. It's old-fashioned and solid [...] This movie was like going to school. I learned a lot about structure and character." He stated in Steve Martin: The Magic Years, "My mature film career started with All of Me and ends with L.A. Story."

== Reception ==
The film received an 85% Rotten Tomatoes score based on 40 reviews, with an average rating of 7.3/10. The site's consensus states: "A high-concept farce carried by Carl Reiner's deft direction and the precise timing of its leads, All of Me is a body-swap comedy worth holding onto." On release, The New York Times described the film: "Some things simply have to be seen to be believed, and the sensational teamwork of Steve Martin and Lily Tomlin in All of Me is one of them [...] Mr. Martin's astonishing performance is the film's most conspicuous asset, but the entire cast is good". On Metacritic, the film received an average weighted score of 68 out of 100 based on 13 critics, indicating "generally favorable" reviews.

=== Accolades ===
Award	Category	Subject	Result
Golden Globe Awards	Best Actress – Motion Picture (Musical or Comedy)	Lily Tomlin	Nominated
Golden Globe Awards	Best Actor – Motion Picture (Musical or Comedy)	Steve Martin	Nominated
National Society of Film Critics Award	Best Actor	Steve Martin	Won
New York Film Critics Circle Award	Best Actor	Steve Martin	Won

== Following the film ==
Steve Martin and Victoria Tennant met during the making of the film and were married in 1986, staying together until 1994.

Several attempts failed to remake All of Me as a film or television show. When the concept was considered for television by NBC in 2015, it was compared to Quantum Leap; NBC would reboot that show in 2022.
