= Lomas Rishi Cave =

Cave in Bihar, India

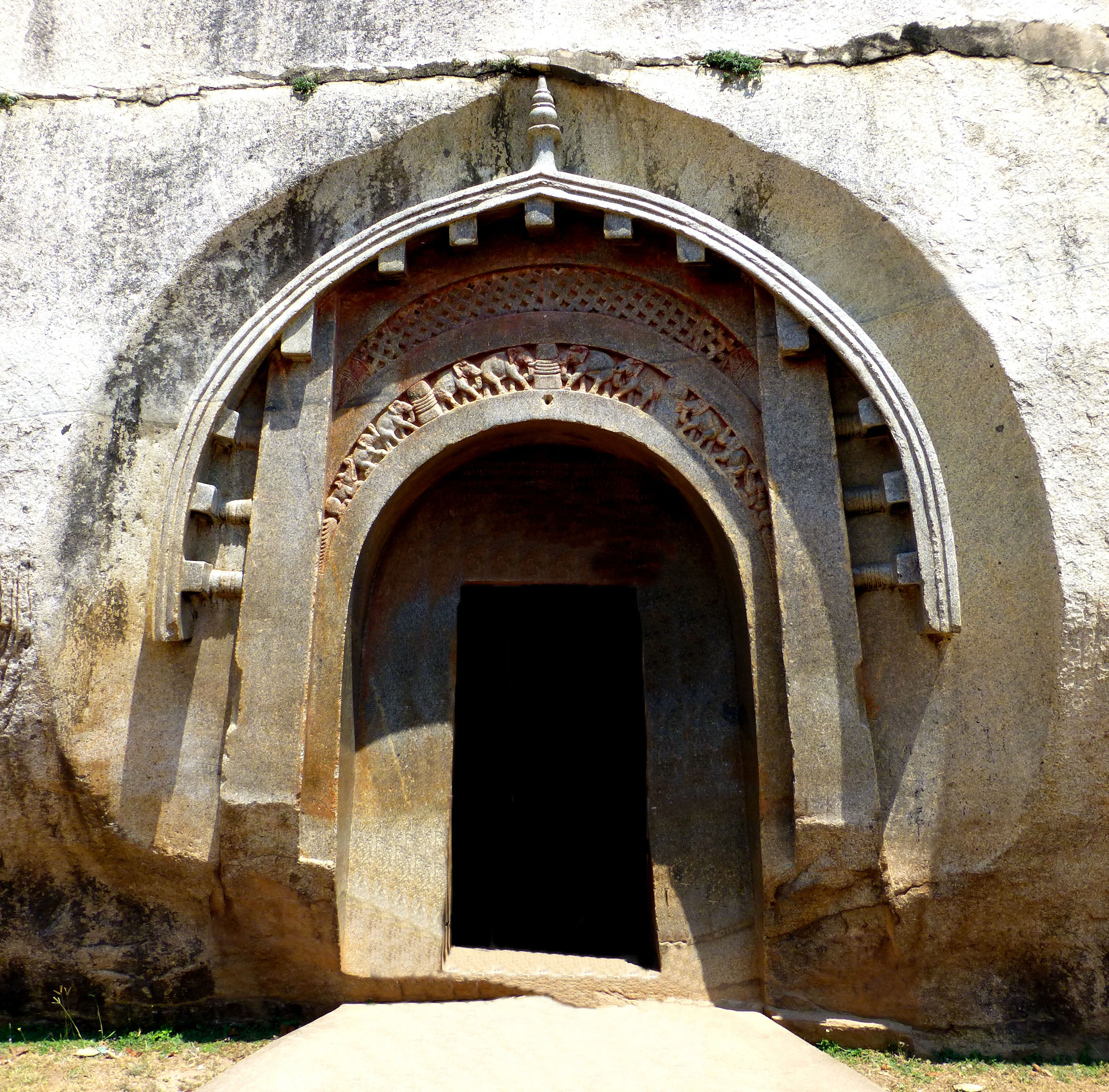
- Entrance to the Lomas Rishi cave, Barabar hills.

- Location within India Location within Bihar

Religion
- Affiliation: Ajivikas or Buddhism, later Hinduism (5th c.AD)
- District: Jehanabad district

Location
- Location: Sultanpur
- State: Bihar
- Country: India
- Interactive map of Lomas Rishi Cave
- Coordinates: 25°00′23.2″N 85°03′52.3″E

Architecture
- Style: Rock-cut cave

The Lomas Rishi Cave, also called the Grotto of Lomas Rishi, is one of the man-made Barabar Caves in the Barabar and Nagarjuni hills of Jehanabad district in the Indian state of Bihar. This rock-cut cave was carved out as a sanctuary. It was built during the Ashokan period of the Maurya Empire in the 3rd century BC, as part of the sacred architecture of the Ajivikas, an ancient religious and philosophical group of India that competed with Jainism and became extinct over time. Ājīvikas were atheists and rejected ritualism of the Puranic karma Kāṇḍa as well as Buddhist ideas. They were ascetic communities and meditated in the Barabar caves. Still, the Lomas Rishi cave lacks an explicit epigraphical dedication to the Ajivikas, contrary to most other Barabar Caves, and may rather have been built by Ashoka for the Buddhists.

The hut-style facade at the entrance to the cave is the earliest survival of the ogee shaped "chaitya arch" or chandrashala that was to be an important feature of Indian rock-cut architecture and sculptural decoration for centuries. The form was clearly a reproduction in stone of buildings in wood and other vegetable materials.

According to Pia Brancaccio, the Lomas Rishi cave, along with nearby Sudama cave, is considered by many scholars to be "the prototype for the Buddhist caves of the western Deccan, particularly the chaitya hall type structure built between 2nd century BC and 2nd century AD.

First is a large hall, entered at the side and rectangular in shape measuring 9.86x5.18m, which functioned as an assembly hall. Further inside is a second hall, smaller in size, which is a semi-hemispherical room, 5m in diameter, with a roof in the form of a dome, and which is accessed from the rectangular room by a narrow rectangular passage. The interior surfaces of the chambers are very finely finished.

== Location ==
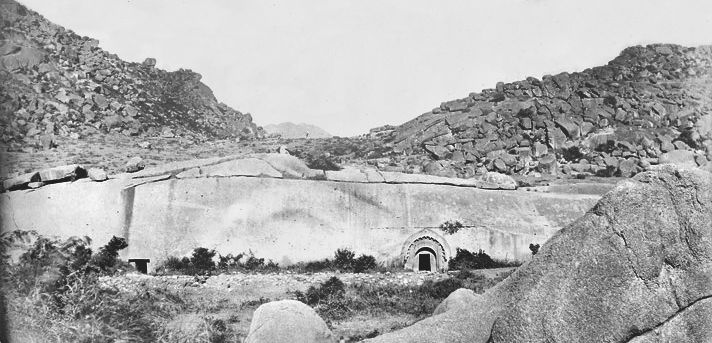
Lomas Rishi and (at left) Sudama caves

Lomas Rishi Cave is carved into the hard, monolithic granite rock face of the Barabar hills, flanked to its left by the smaller Sudama cave. The site is close to the Falgu River, and the Barabar Caves Information Centre is close by. The cave is 30 kilometres (19 mi) north of Gaya in Bihar, an eastern state in India, and about 1,500 kilometres (930 mi) from the Ajanta Caves. It is distant from other major archaeological sites related to art and architecture; for example, it is about 1,000 kilometres (620 mi) from Mathura and about 2,200 kilometres (1,400 mi) from Gandhara.

== History ==
During the reign of Mauryan emperor Ashoka, Lomas Rishi Cave was excavated and gifted to the Ajivikas sage Lomasha. It is dated to the 3rd century BC. Additional caves followed in the same granite hills, all in the 3rd century BC, based on the inscriptions found in the caves. The other six caves are (i) Karna Chaupar, (ii) Sudama Cave, (iii) Vishmitra Cave, (iv) Gopi Cave, (v) Vapiyaka Cave, and (vi) Vadathika Cave. The last three are on the Nagarjuni Hill east of the Barabar Hill.

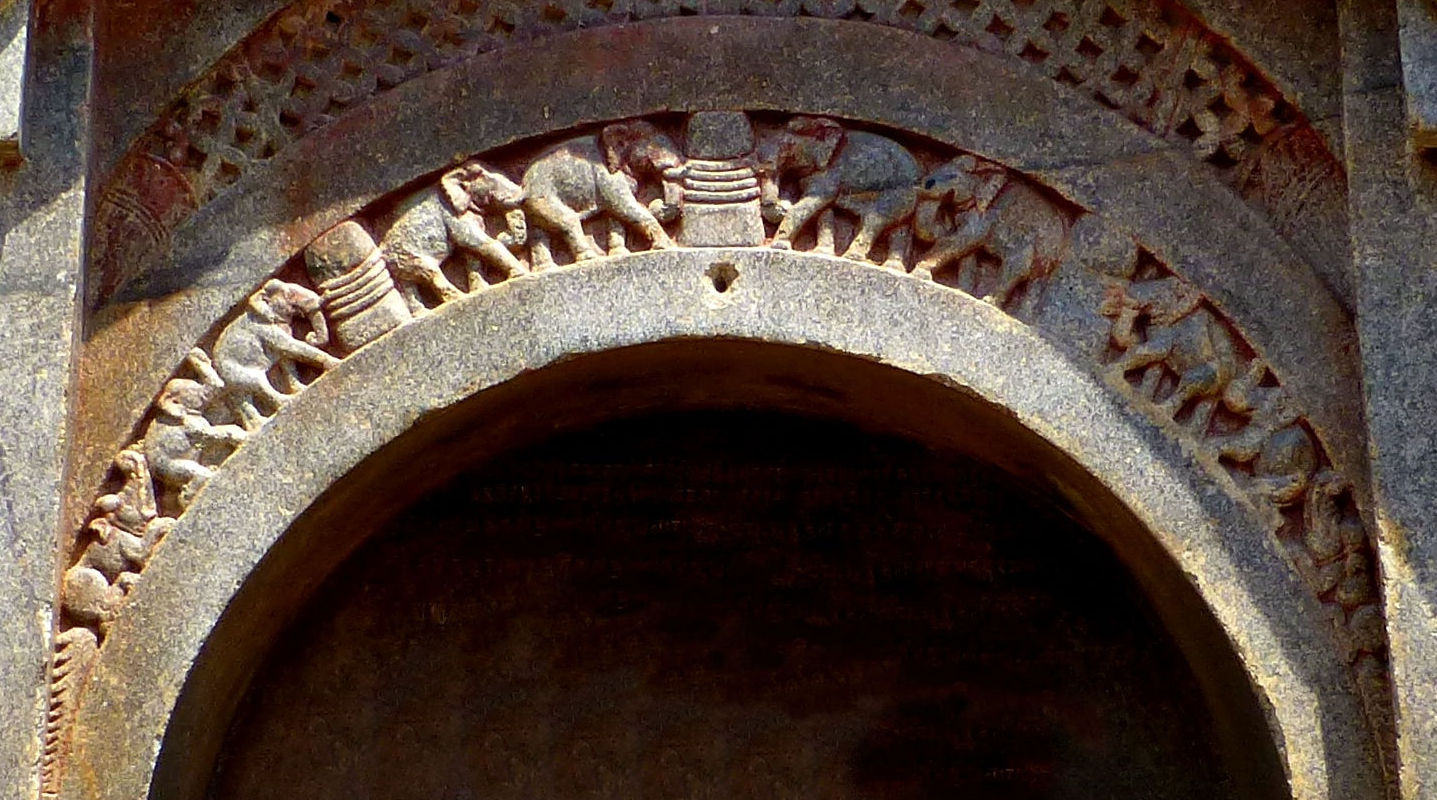
The ornate doorway.

Burgess, in his cave temple survey of 19th-century, considered the Ajivika Lomas Rishi cave to an anchor milestone for cave chronology. According to Pia Brancaccio, the Lomas Rishi cave, along with nearby Sudama cave, is considered by many scholars to be "the prototype for the Buddhist caves of the western Deccan, particularly the chaitya hall type structure built between 2nd century BC and 2nd-century AD. According to Vidya Dehejia, the Kondvite chaitya hall is a direct descendant of the Lomas Rishi cave, and other Buddhist cave-based vihara monasteries followed. The Lomas Rishi doorway, states James Harle, the "earliest example of the caitya arch", later to develop into the gavaska (ogee arch in European Gothic architecture), a feature that later became "the most ubiquitous of all Indian architectural motifs".

According to Arthur Basham, the elephant and other motifs carved at the entrance caitya arch and the walls of the Lomas Rishi cave are those of Ajivika, and this taken with the inscription of Ashoka giving nearby caves to them, suggests they were the original inhabitants. They abandoned the caves at some point, then Buddhists used it because there are the Bodhimula and Klesa-kantara inscriptions in this cave's door jamb. Thereafter a Hindu king named Anantavarman, of Maukhari dynasty, dedicated a Krishna murti to the cave, states Basham, in the 5th or 6th century. This is evidenced by the Sanskrit inscription found on the arch.

E. M. Forster based the important scene in the "Marabar Caves" in his novel A Passage to India (1924) on these caves, which he had visited.

== Features ==
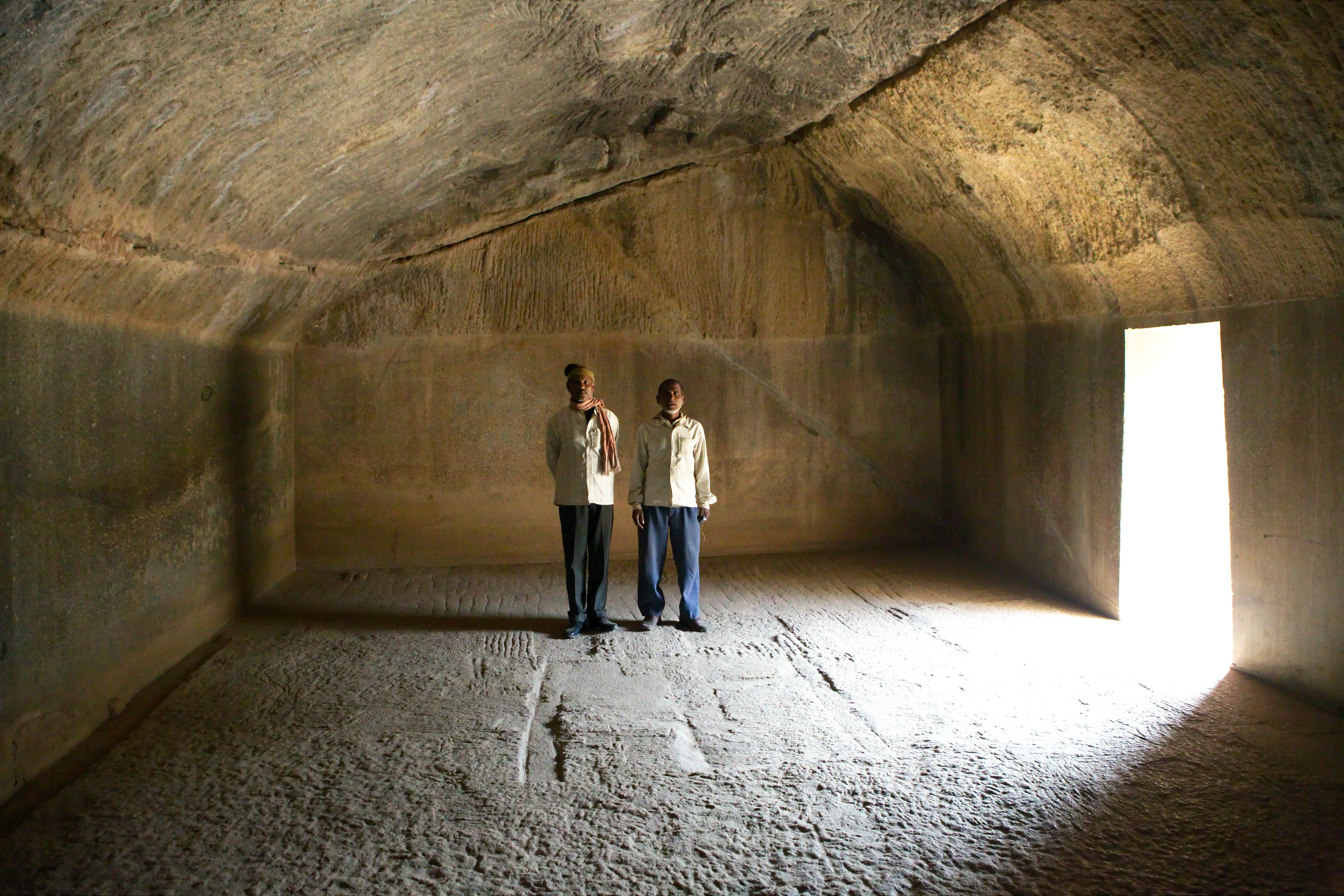
Unfinished interior (floor and ceiling) of Lomas Rishi cave. The rocky bumps left in the state on the ground, presented by Gupta as a proof of a hasty interruption of the digging, appear in the farther left corner.

This cave has an arched facade that probably imitates contemporary wooden architecture. On the periphery of the door, along the curve of the architrave, a line of elephants advances in the direction of stupas emblems. This is the characteristic form of the "Chaitya arch" or chandrashala, to be an important feature of architecture and sculpture in the rock for many centuries. It is clearly a stone reproduction of wooden buildings and other plant materials. According to Gupta, Lomas Rishi's immediate successors are the Kondivite and Guntupalli caves. The facade of the rock-cut cave is in the form of a thatched hut supported by timber struts and has a doorway that is intricately carved to replicate timber architecture. Its eaves are curved and the finial is in the shape of a pot. The ornamentation on the "curved architrave" consists of carvings of elephants on their way to a stupa-like structure.

Inscriptions

Lomas Rishi has no Ashoka inscription, perhaps because it has never been completed due to structural rock slide problems. It is generally considered, however, that it was also created around 250 BC, like the other caves, because of the similarity of the internal structure and the degree of finish of the rock, the walls being perfectly polished, with the exception of the vault whose digging was interrupted. On the other hand, it has a much later inscription of Anantavarman above the entrance, from the 5th century of our era.

Terminal event

According to Gupta, the theory that Lomas Rishi would not have received Ashoka's inscription because it was in a state of incompleteness, is undermined by the fact that the cave of Vivaskarma, another cave of Barabar, although it is not finished, was nevertheless consecrated by Ashoka. The consecration of a cave could therefore be done in the course of work. This could imply that Lomas Rishi, with its bas-reliefs, actually post-dates Ashoka's reign.

Gupta actually believes that Lomas Rishi post-dates both Ashoka and his grandson Dasaratha, and would have been built at the end of the Maurya Empire, under the reign of its last Emperor Brihadratha, and abruptly halted in 185 BC with the assassination of Brihadratha and the coup d'état of Pushyamitra Sunga, founder of the Sunga dynasty. Pushyamitra Sunga is also known to have persecuted Buddhists and Ajivikas, which would explain the immediate cessation of work. According to Gupta, the abrupt interruption of the works is suggested by the lack of finishing, even approximate, of the ground, with for example the abandonment in the state of some bumps of rocks on the floor which would have required only a few minutes of chipping to be removed in order to obtain a fairly regular floor.

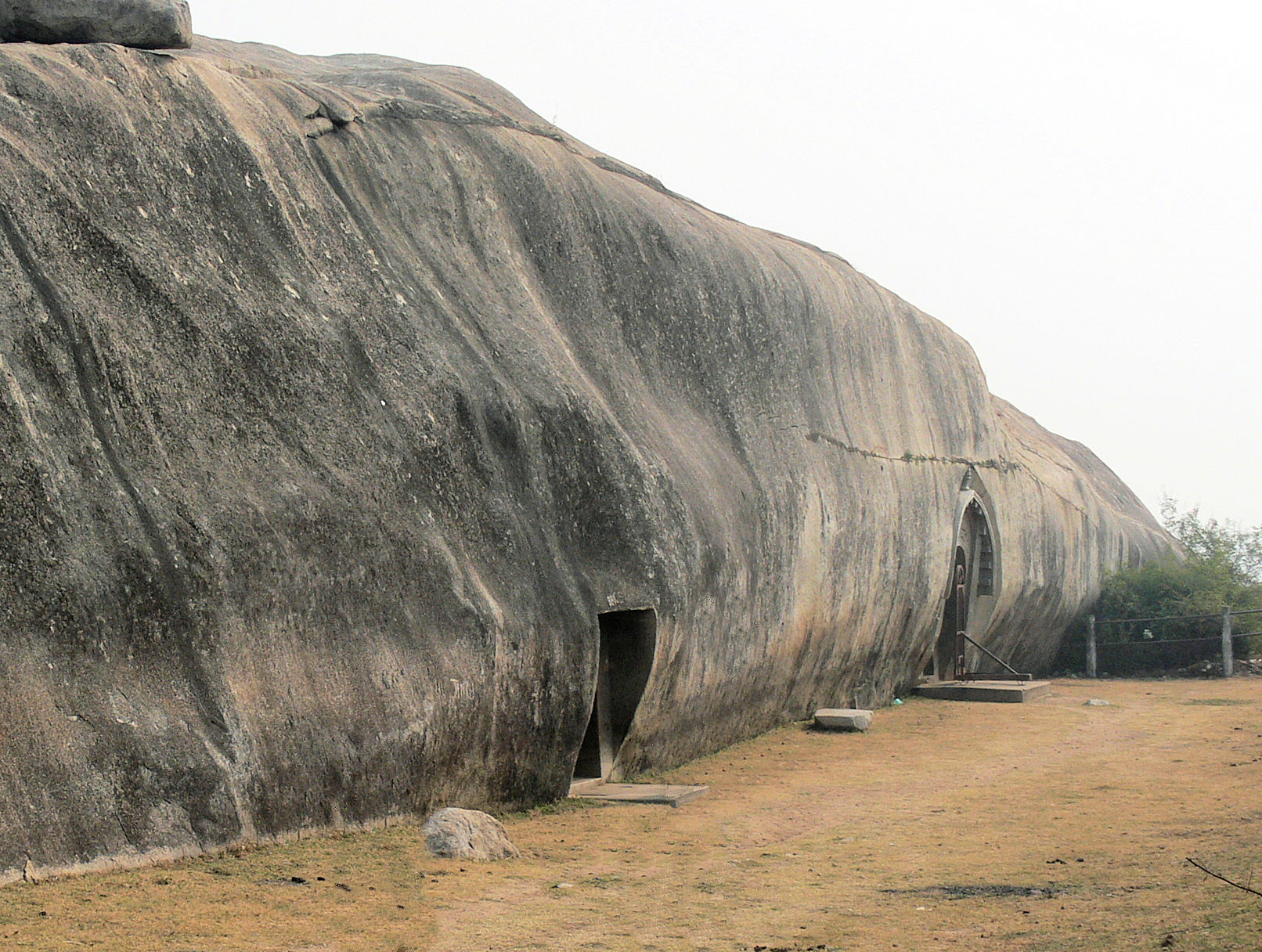
Entrances of Sudama Cave, and further, Lomas Rishi Cave, Barabar Hill.

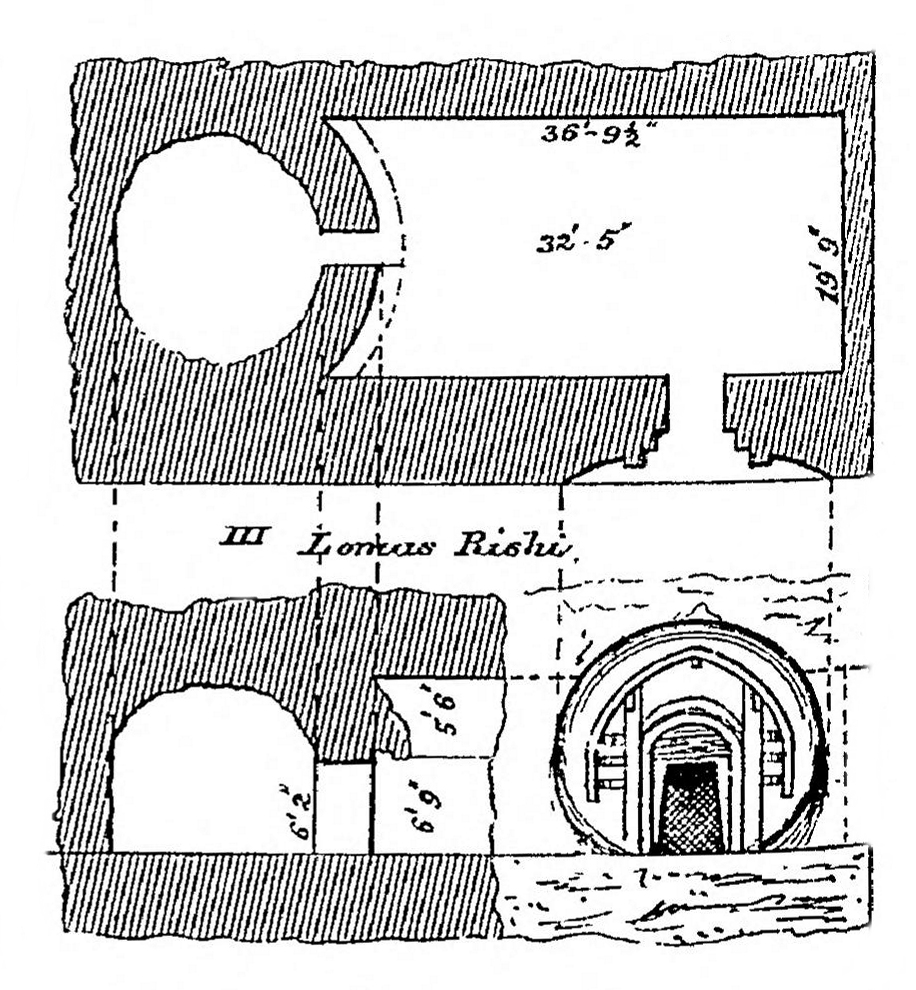
Plan of the cave.

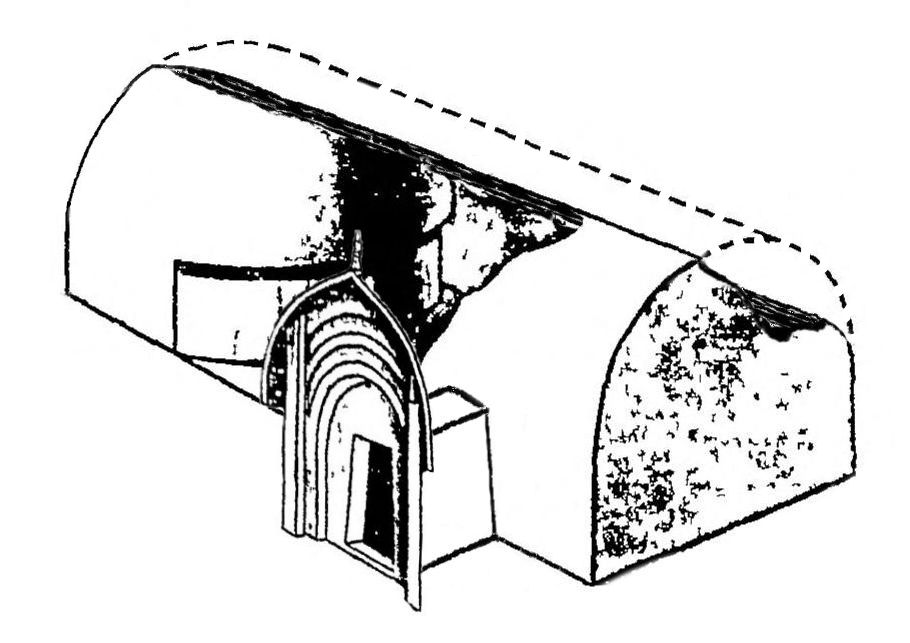
Volume representation of Lomas Rishi Cave. The digging of the vault has never been finished.

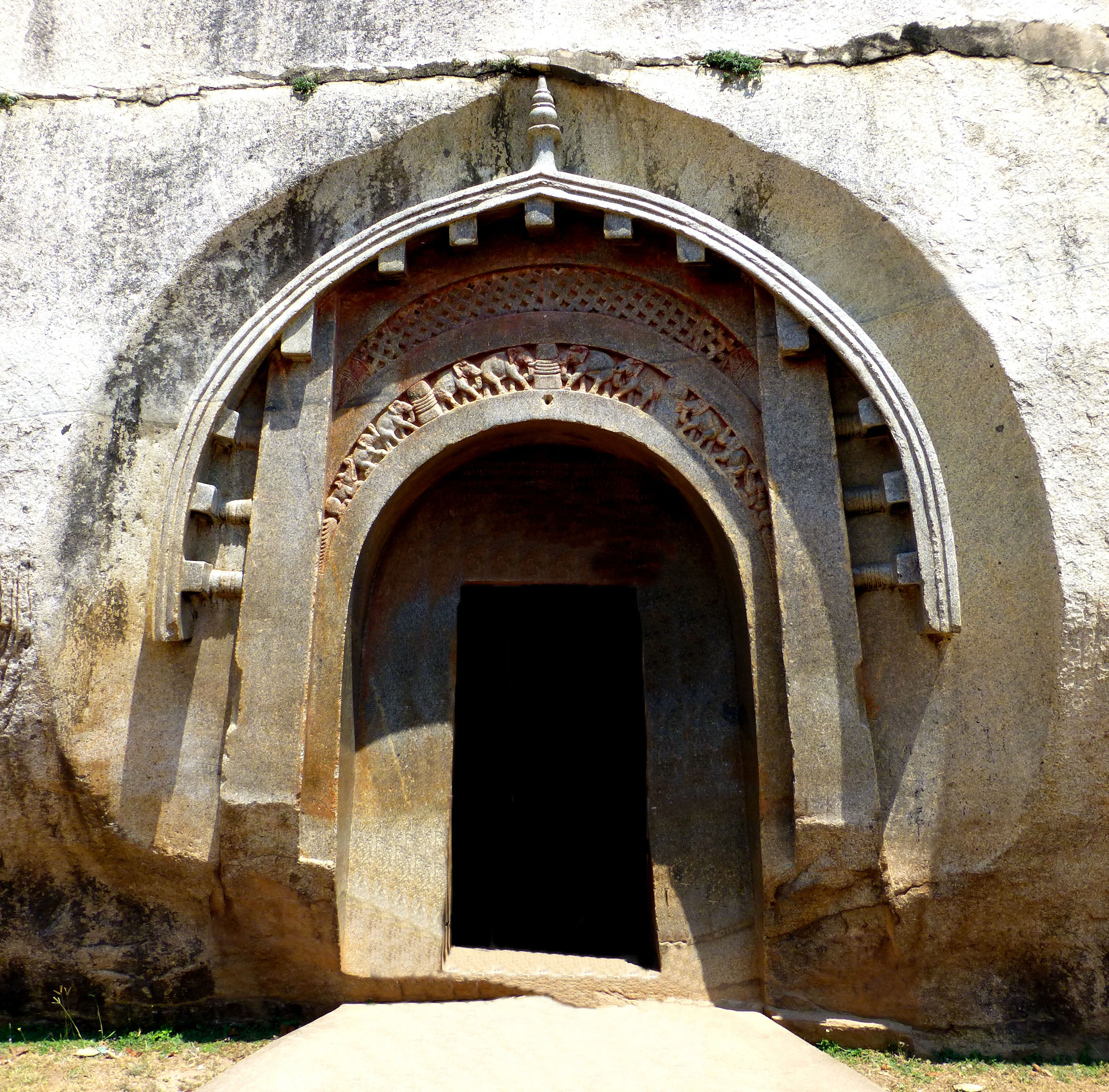
Entrance to the cave.

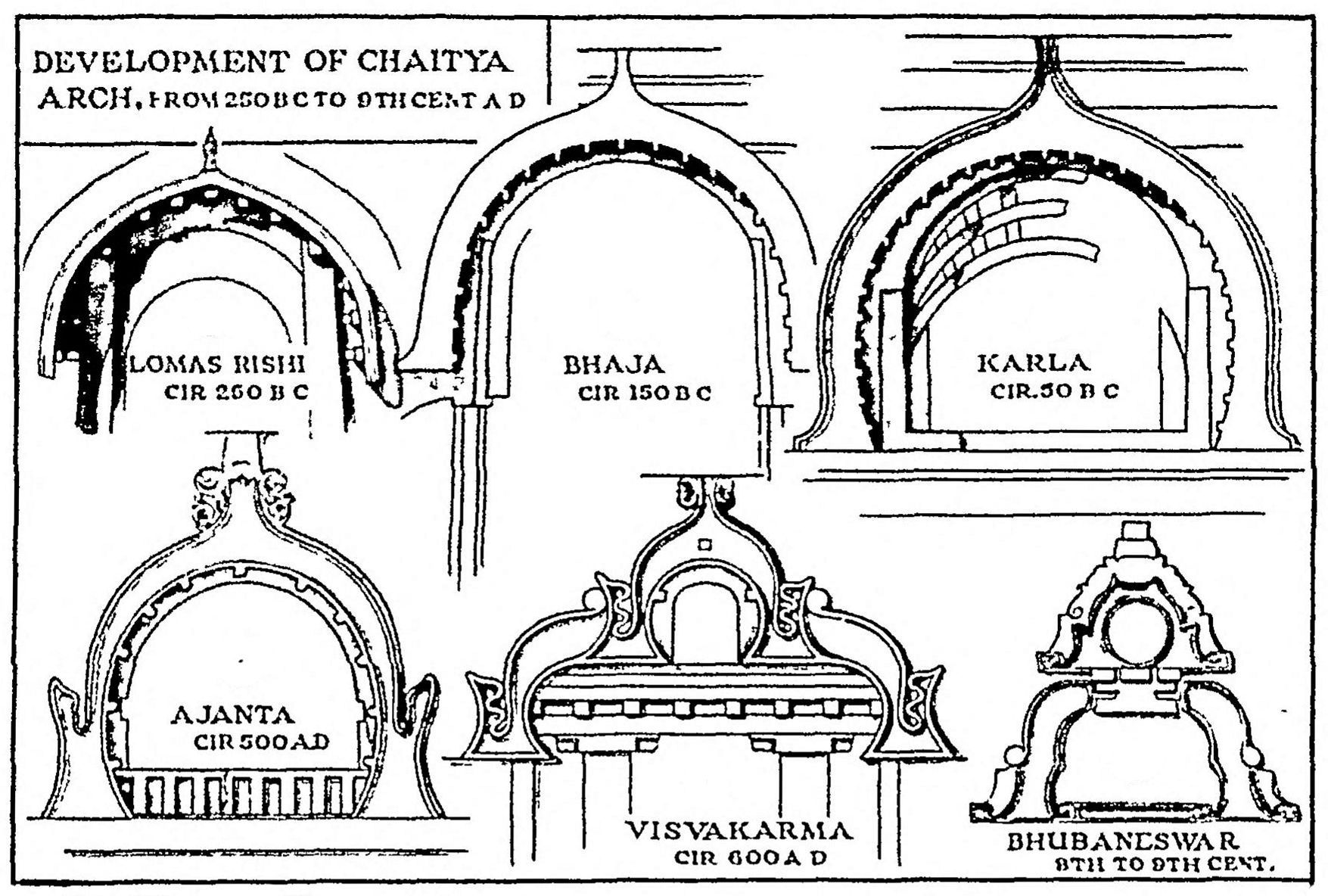
Development of the Chaitya Arch from Lomas Rishi Cave on, from a book by Percy Brown.

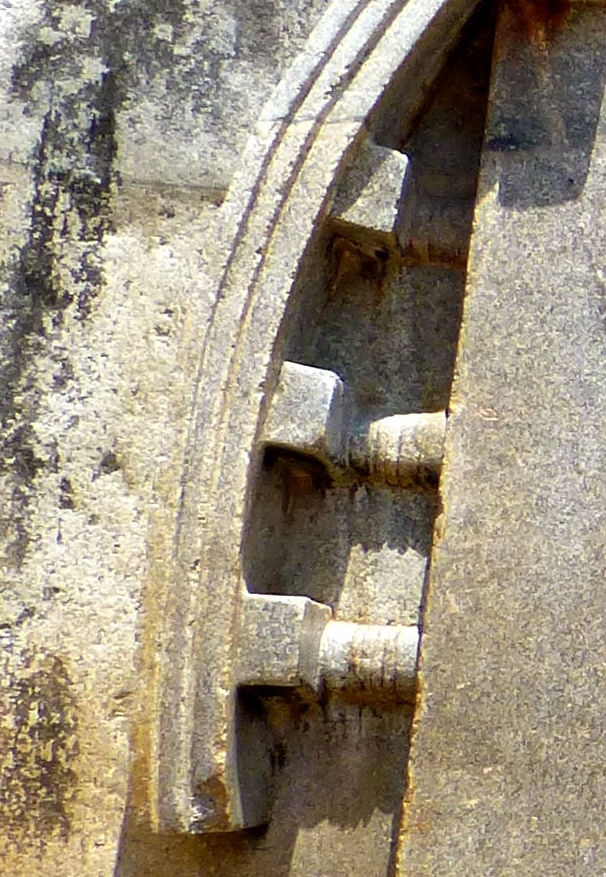
Wooden architecture reproduced in stone.

== Inscription of Anantavarman (5-6th century CE) ==
Several Hindu inscriptions of the Maukhari king Anantavarman of the 5-6th century CE also appear in the Barabar Caves: an inscription of Anantavarman above the cave entrance of Lomas Rishi, and the Gopika Cave Inscription and the Vadathika Cave Inscription in the caves of the Nagarjuni group, in the same caves where the dedicatory inscriptions of the grandson of Ashoka, Dasaratha, are also located.

The term Aajivikehi is often found erased in nearly all Mauryan cave inscriptions of Barabar and Nagarjuni Caves. It seems that during the reign of the Maukhari ruler Anantavarma, when idols of Krishna and Shiva were installed in these caves, this term was erased, leading to a decline in the influence of the Aajivikas.

Inscription of Anantavarman (Lomas Rishi cave)
Translation in English	Original in Sanskrit (original text of Lomas Rishi Cave)
Om! He, Anantavarman, who was the excellent son, captivating the heart of mankind, of the illustrious Sardaula, and who, possessed of very great virtues, adorned by his own (high) birth in the family of Maukhari kings, - him, of unsullied fame, with joy caused to be made, as if it were his own fame represented in bodily form in the world, this beautiful image, placed in (this) cave of the mountain Pravaragiri, of the (god) Krishna. (Line 3.) - The illustrious Sardula, of firmly established fame, the best among chieftains, became the ruler of the earth, he who was a very death to hostile kings; who was a tree the fruits of which were the (fulfilled) wishes of his favourites; who was the torch of the family of the warrior caste, which is glorious through waging many battles; (and) who, charming the thoughts of lovely women, resembled (the god) Smara. (L. 5.) - On whatsoever enemy the illustrious king Sardula casts in anger his scowling eye, the expanded and tremulous and clear and beloved pupil of which is red at the comers between the uplifted brows,— on him there falls the death-dealing arrow, discharged from the bowstring drawn up to (his) ear, of his son, the giver of endless pleasure, who has the name of Anantavarman. Corpus Inscriptionum Indicarum, Fleet p.223	
