= Marabar Caves =

Fictional caves created by E. M. Forster

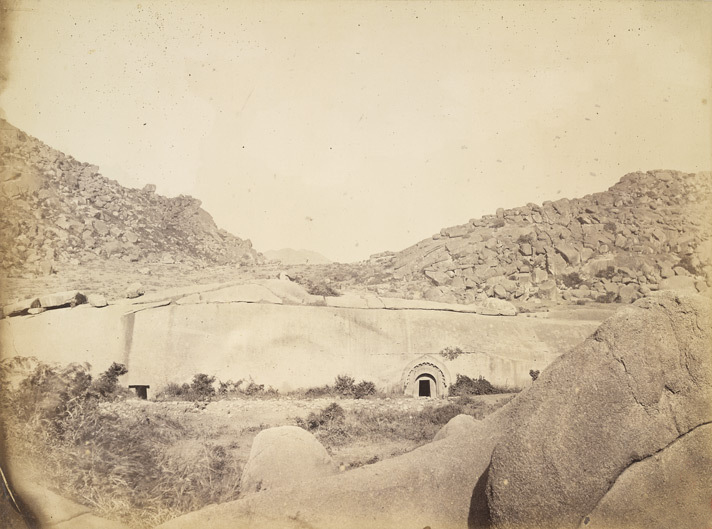
Exterior of the real Barabar Caves in 1870; Lomas Rishi Cave and (at left) Sudama cave.

The Marabar Caves are fictional caves which appear in E. M. Forster's 1924 novel A Passage to India and the film of the same name. The caves are based on the real life Barabar Caves, especially the Lomas Rishi Cave, located in the Jehanabad District of Bihar, India which Forster visited during a trip to India.

The caves serve as an important plot location and motif in the story. Key features of the caves are the glass-smooth walls and a peculiar resonant echo that amplifies sound. The echo makes the sound “ou-boum” and that sound haunts the characters afterwards. Forster chose the caves to set a turning point in the novel, not just for the character Adela, but also for Mrs Moore, Cyril Fielding and Dr. Aziz: the caves mark a turning point in the novel and their lives. The caves are significant because they mark the hollowness in the lives of the four main characters. None of them are getting what they want and are trying to find a balance in life amid expanding chaos.

== The real-life Barabar Caves ==
The real-life Barabar Caves were used by an Ajivika sect during 322–185 BCE and eventually became somewhat of a tourist attraction. E. M. Forster, having heard about them, decided to visit during a trip to India in 1913 and was left impressed by them.

After the book and film version, there was more awareness of the real-life Barabar Caves. It led to a slight increase in tourism to the area. A study published in 2009 to assess making the caves an official eco-tourism site concluded that the lack of infrastructure near the caves made it a poor location to attract large amounts of tourists.

=== Writing the book ===
Forster travelled to India during a trip which inspired his novel. While there, he visited his friend Syed Ross Masood. Masood told Forster about the Barabar Caves and said "you will write a novel about it."

Forster visited Masood in Bankipore. Forster was gay and was in love with Masood, who was straight and therefore could not reciprocate. Forster also learned that Masood would be marrying. On Forster's last day in Bankipore, he visited the Barabar Caves. Forster wrote in his diary that that day was "long and sad." It has been speculated that the rejection of Forster's love was used as inspiration for the book: though not stated, perhaps Miss Quested admitted her love to Aziz in the caves. That final day and the visit to the caves left a huge impression on Forster.

Forster dedicated the book to Masood. It would be his final novel.

=== In the film ===
In the film version of the book, the real Barabar caves were not used. Instead, the scenes were filmed in Savandurga, southwest of Bangalore. David Lean, the film's director, supposedly believed the real caves lacked the grandeur he wanted for the scene.

=== In theater ===
The book was first adapted in 1960 by Indian-American playwright Santha Rama Rau into a play by the same name. In it, the caves are presented during the second act. This play inspired the film.

American playwright Martin Sherman also made an adaption of the novel for the stage. In an interview, he stresses the importance of the caves. The caves are central in his adaption: "It reduces the story to focus purely on what happens in the Marabar Caves. The greatest achievement of Martin's adaptation is that it's not just about getting to the end, but about the repercussions of the case."

== Relevance in the novel ==
The main characters Mrs. Moore, Adela Quested, and Dr. Aziz are in a large group that journeys to the Marabar Caves. During the tour of the caves Adela, Dr. Aziz, and a local guide carry on separately from the group. Adela privately questions her love for Ronny, a British Civil Magistrate in Chandrapore. Assuming that the Muslim Dr. Aziz has multiple wives, she questions him about the nature of love. Rattled by the question, as his only wife has died, leaving two sons and a daughter, Dr. Aziz takes temporary leave of her to have a cigarette. When Adela enters a cave, her claustrophobia, as well as what some critics have assumed is a sexual desire for Aziz, and the consequent guilt over her lack of feeling for Ronny, combine to overwhelm her. She flees the caves down a steep incline and is pierced and lacerated by strongly thorned plants along the way. Adela manages to find someone at the bottom of the slopes who helps her to return to Chandrapore where she lodges a charge of molestation against Dr. Aziz. A trial ensues which is central to the novel's development of the cultural biases and conflicts that occur during the Raj. Later, during the trial, Adela overcomes the echo that has followed her from the caves and accepts her mistake. Aziz is released but he remains furious over the incident. The caves incident leads to a rift between these characters and Aziz starts believing he has been cheated by Fielding and Adela. He wants Adela to pay for the troubles she caused but Fielding persuades him not to harass the poor girl further who made the mistake out of fear and confusion. This makes Aziz and other Muslims suspect Fielding and Adela of conspiring against Aziz and being in a relationship.

=== Mystery of the caves ===
What really happened inside the caves remains a mystery and no one discovers what really happened. Aziz and Fielding suspect it was the guide who molested her, but nothing is conclusively proven.

The caves are central to both the theme and the structure of the novel and add meaning to its plot. They also give the novel a definite tone. Forster calls India a muddle and uses the caves to explain the sense of mystery and muddle enveloping India. The caves remain mysterious and the echo haunts both Mrs Moore and Adela. The confusion born inside the caves destroys the equilibrium in people's personal lives and relationships. Mrs Moore dies soon after the incident on her way back to England. Aziz remains suspicious of his friends, including Fielding and Adela Quested. He proceeds to reject Western influence to find solace among his own people and society. The Marabar Caves and the myths born of them represent a unique side of the Indian culture and how it keeps people within their respective compartments. The caves represent, metaphorically, the rising movement in India for independence. Aziz's journey throughout the caves, and his subsequent trial, represent the development of nationalist and pro-independence ideals among the populace of India. The caves also symbolize the cosmic forces that remain prominent throughout the novel till the end.

=== Interpretations ===
Some interpretations have been made by academics about the symbolism and meaning of the caves. For example, Vinod Cardoza, suggests a Hindu interpretation for the caves, suggesting that the characters could have experienced the principle of Cit. Murat Salar, however suggests that the caves represent an awakening, opposing other interpretations of caves as places of darkness in Western literature. Sunu Rose Joseph provides an existentialist analysis of the caves. One reviewer takes a Jungian approach, saying that the caves represent the central psychological symbol of the plot.

For George Steiner in The New Yorker, the modest achievement of Forster's other novel Maurice served to magnify the greatness of A Passage to India:

Subtlest of all is Forster's solution of the problem of 'physical realization.' In Maurice, this basic difficulty had lamed him. Unlike Gide or Lawrence, he had found no sensuous enactment adequate to his vision of sex. Gesture recedes in a cloying mist. The mysterious outrage in the Marabar caves is a perfect solution. Though, as the rest of the novel will show, 'nothing has happened' in that dark and echoing place, the force of sexual suggestion is uncompromising. As only a true writer can, Forster had found his way to a symbolic action richer, more precise than any single concrete occurrence.

== Influences ==
A granite and water artwork in Washington DC, created by American architect Elyn Zimmerman, is named Marabar, inspired by the location in the book. It is one of her most famous works.

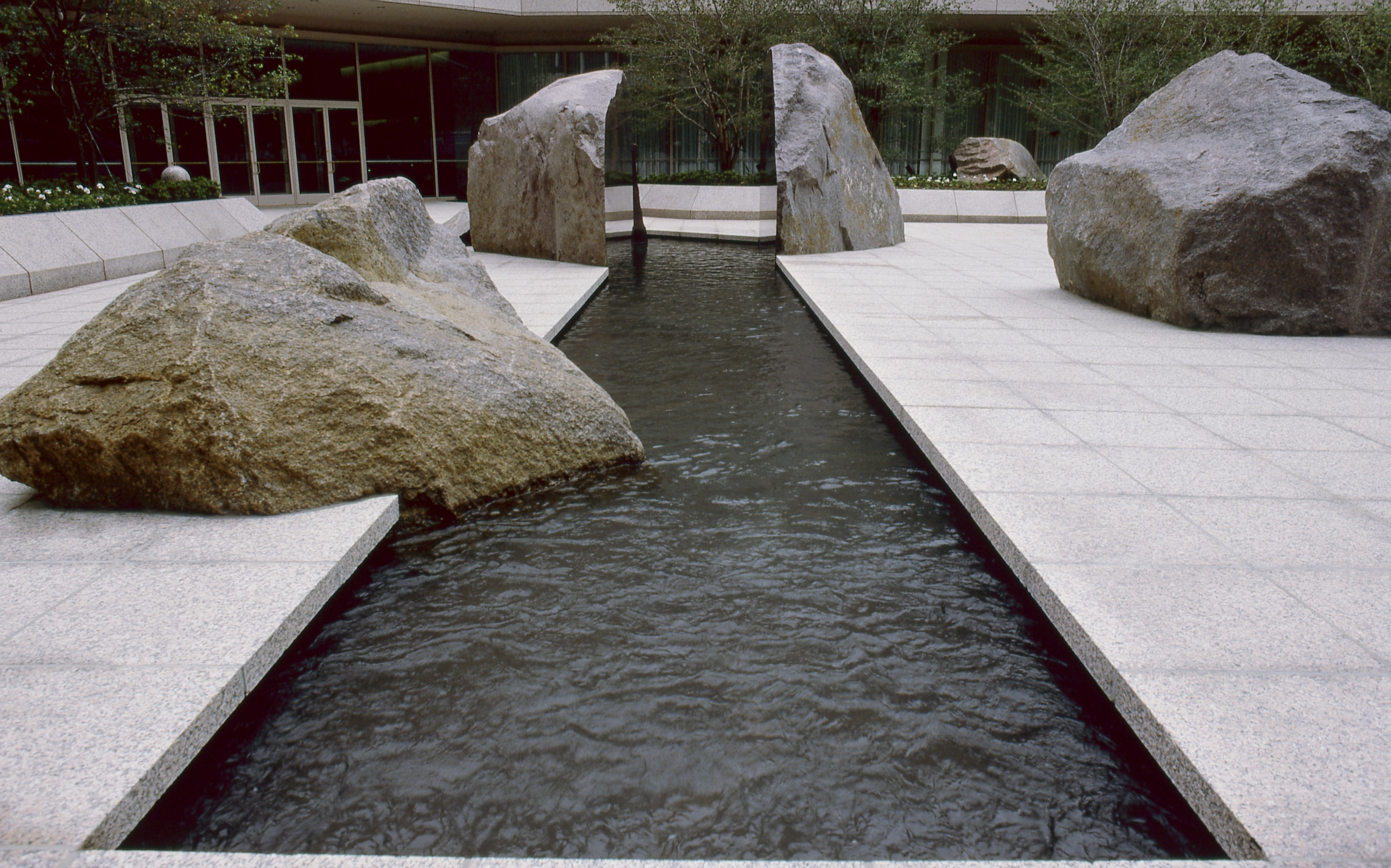
Marabar by Elyn Zimmerman.

Artist Linda Day has an artwork titled "Ou-boum" after the sound the caves make in the novel.

An art history class from Nalanda University led a trip to the Barabar Caves after being inspired by the Marabar Caves of the novel.

An influential 1980s punk rock band from Northampton England is named The Marabar Caves after the place in the novel.

An exhibition at the Gus Fisher Gallery in New Zealand took its inspiration from the novel's depiction of the caves. The exhibition was titled The Marabar Caves.

== Other allusions ==
The caves have been used in reference to the Insurgency in Balochistan.
