= Charles T. McDowell =

American academic (1921–2007)

Charles Taylor McDowell
- Born: November 23, 1921; Twin Falls, Idaho
- Died: July 8, 2007 (aged 85); Arlington, TX
- Occupations: Professor of Russian, Military Officer
- Spouse: Mary Frances McDowell (deceased)

Charles Taylor McDowell (November 23, 1921 – July 8, 2007) was professor emeritus and former director of the Center for Post-Soviet and Eastern European Studies at the University of Texas at Arlington, and a member of the Military Science Hall of Honor. Prior to founding and becoming director of the Center for Post Soviet and Eastern European Studies, McDowell served as Assistant to the President and Dean of Student Life at the University during the late 1960s, which saw the Rebel Theme Controversy and attempts by the Students for a Democratic Society to establish a chapter on campus. He was the first chair of the UT Arlington Faculty Senate, a position to which he was re-elected six times.

At UT Arlington, McDowell was regularly cited as one of the most popular professors among students and has been the recipient of numerous teaching awards.

== Military career ==
Prior to his academic career, McDowell had a long career with the United States Army and government agencies. After graduating from Texas A&M University (then known as the Agricultural and Mechanical college of Texas) and the Officer Candidate School at Fort Benning, Georgia, he was commissioned second lieutenant of infantry in the U. S. Army. After commissioning, McDowell was assigned to teach in the Army Specialized Training Program (ASTP) at Fort Benning. He then attended the Basic Airborne Course at Fort Benning, and, after completion, was assigned to the 82nd Airborne Division and the 11th Airborne Division. He also served with the 97th Infantry Division in Europe. His early assignments included command positions from platoon leader to battalion commander. As part of the 82nd Airborne Division, McDowell participated in Operation Market Garden, jumping behind enemy lines and engaging objectives in Nijmegen and Arnhem.

During later assignments McDowell was a professor at Tokyo Army College (1946–1948) and was commandant and director of the College (1947–1948). While serving as director of the Tokyo Army College, McDowell was sent by General Douglas MacArthur to recruit Japanese-French woodblock print artist Paul Jacoulet – who had been in seclusion in Karuizawa – to the college. General MacArthur and Commandant McDowell became avid collectors of Jacoulet woodblock prints.

From 1947 to 1949, McDowell was information and education officer for the Eighth U.S. Army and later the 82nd Airborne Division. From 1955 to 1958 he was a professor of Russian language, history, economics, geography, and political science in a classified joint military/civilian intelligence agency and chief of the research division from 1956 to 1958. In 1959, McDowell was an instructor for the Command and General Staff College in Taiwan, Japan, Korea, and Hawaii, where he taught U.S. military forces about nuclear weapons.

McDowell was a graduate of the Defense Language Institute, the Foreign Area Specialist Program, the Defense Intelligence Course, the Armed Forces Staff College, the Command and General Staff College, and a two-year Soviet-East Europe Advanced Foreign Area Studies Program at the doctoral level as one of a small number of State Department, military, and intelligence agency personnel selected to participate in the program known as Detachment R. He received a BS degree from Texas A&M University, an MA from Columbia University in 1953 and in 1956 a PhD from Texas A&M University. McDowell retired as a colonel.

== At UT Arlington ==
McDowell joined the University of Texas at Arlington (then Arlington State College) in 1959 as Assistant Professor of Military Science and Tactics. After being promoted to lieutenant colonel, he left the university to serve on the Joint Chiefs of Staff, where he was intelligence officer of the Airborne Command Post, a job that often involved flying with the President of the United States and his senior staff to evaluate foreign military threats and provide mobile control of U.S. nuclear forces. In this role, McDowell was the custodian of the Nuclear Football, which is used by the President of the United States to authorize the use of nuclear weapons while away from fixed command centers.

McDowell was a Master Combat Parachutist and has been awarded the Combat Infantryman Badge. Other decorations include the Bronze Star with Oak Leaf Cluster and Army Commendation Medal with Oak Leaf Cluster, the American Defense Service Medal, American Campaign Medal, European Campaign Medal, Asiatic-Pacific Campaign Medal, World War II Victory Medal, Army of Occupation Medal, Korean Service Medal, and the United Nations Medal. McDowell has served as a Diplomatic courier and USSR Specialist, as well as a Foreign Service Officer for the State Department in the former Soviet Union, Europe, Asia, and North Africa.

McDowell was senior area administrator for Lyndon Johnson's Job Corps program, which entailed supervision of all centers in the United States between the Mississippi River and Rocky Mountains.

At the request of President Jack Woolf of UT Arlington, McDowell returned to the university in 1966 to serve as assistant to the president and, from 1967 to 1969, as dean of student life. He later became the director of the Center for Post-Soviet and Eastern European Studies and the chair of the Department of Foreign Languages and Linguistics. McDowell was the first chairman of the Faculty Senate at the University of Texas at Arlington and was re-elected to that position on four subsequent occasions. He served as faculty sponsor of Alpha Phi Omega, Alpha Chi Honor Society, the Soviet and East European Club, and the Student Congress. He was honored for his teaching, advising, and mentoring of students with multiple awards, including the AMOCO Award as Outstanding Teacher (now Chancellor's Council Award), Best Academic Advisor, Best Advisor of Student Organizations, and four nominations as UT Arlington's candidate for the Piper Award for Outstanding Teaching.

== Back in Texas ==
After returning to Texas, Charles and Mary Frances McDowell built a home on a tract of land in Arlington, Texas, where they hosted some of the first delegations from behind the Iron Curtain to the United States during the Cold War era. The McDowells had two children, Charles Patrick McDowell, a Vice President at Goodrich Corporation, and Kathy McDowell Stewart (deceased), an attorney who worked in various positions with the U.S. State Department and the Central Intelligence Agency's Directorate of Operations and Office of General Counsel. Stewart is the namesake of the CIA's Kathy Stewart Award, the highest honor that can be awarded to a staff member in the CIA's Office of General Counsel.

McDowell made many contributions to print and televised media concerning the Soviet Union, People's Republic of China, and subjects related to Eastern Europe. McDowell was the author and co-author of many articles, documents, and books, including classified government documents concerning the Soviet Union. He also authored book reviews published by the Dallas Morning News. He served as either chief translator or as editor on projects conducting non-classified technical, industrial, scientific and literary translations both from English to Russian and from Russian to English.

== Posthumous honors ==
On May 17, 2009, the San Saba Historical Museum in San Saba County, Texas unveiled a permanent exhibit on McDowell's life. During the ceremony, San Saba Mayor Ken Jordan presented a proclamation of the City Council designating May 17 "Charles Taylor McDowell day."

The University of Texas at Arlington set up the Charles T. McDowell Center for Critical Languages and Area Studies, which builds on the Center for Post Soviet and Eastern European Studies to include other regions of strategic importance to the United States. With support from the McDowell Center, the Department of Modern Languages at UT Arlington has expanded its offerings to include courses in Arabic, Chinese, Portuguese and Korean. Additionally, the McDowell Center and the Department of Modern Languages have collaborated to develop a new interdisciplinary degree program in Critical Languages and International Studies.

In 2011, the 82nd Texas Legislature honored McDowell with the unanimous adoption of H.R. No. 1064, introduced by State Representative Harvey Hilderbran.
