= Yajna =

Ritual offering sacrifice in Hinduism

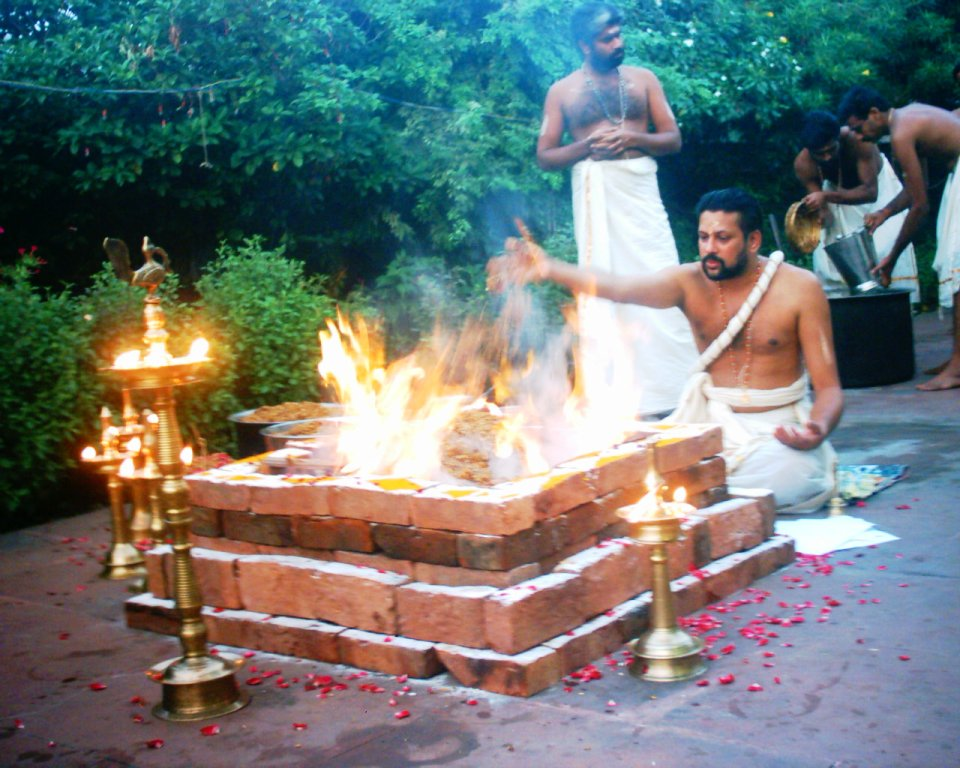
A yagna being performed by Nambudiris of Kerala

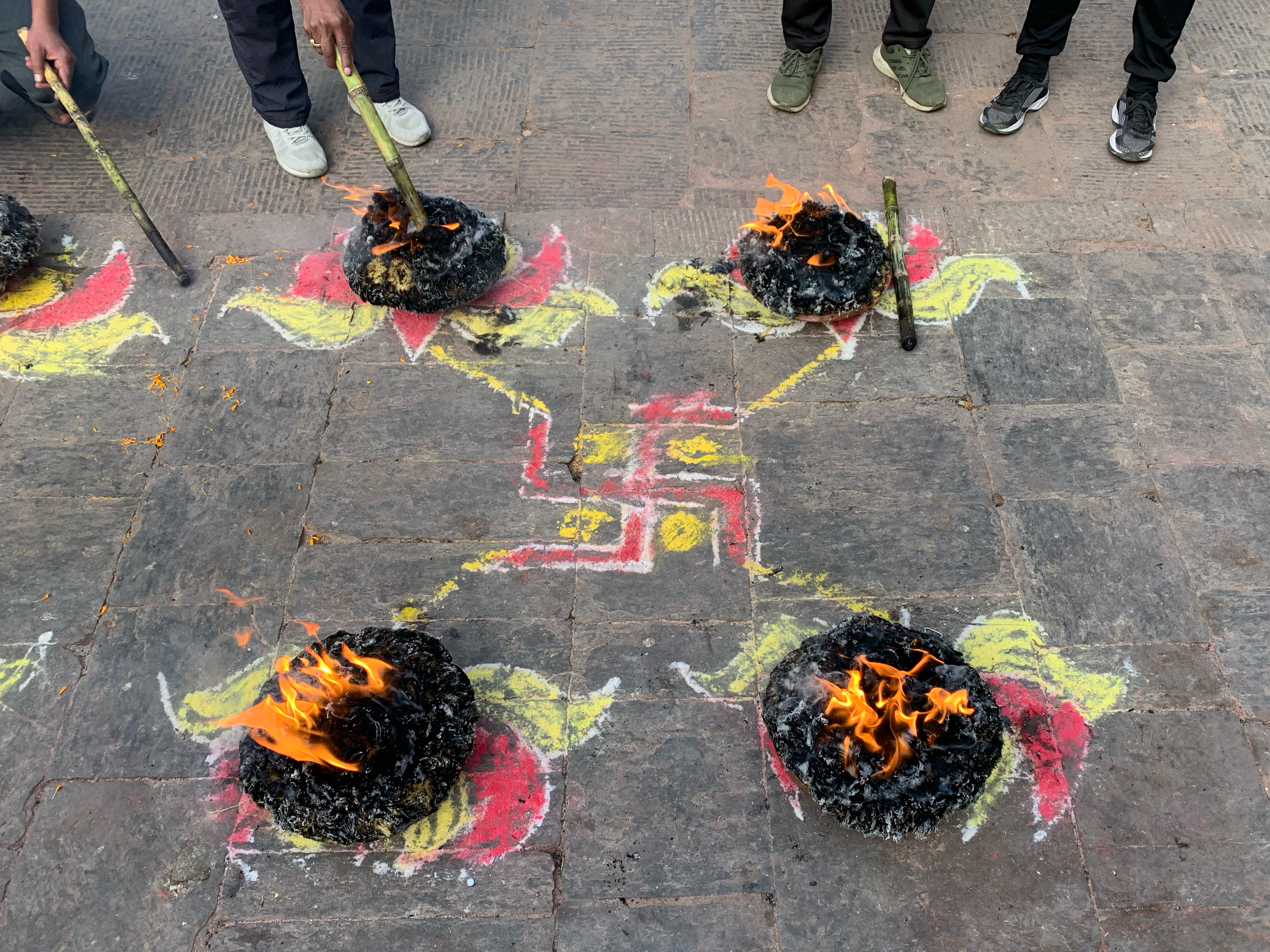
A mandala for yajna in Kumbheshwar Temple, Nepal

In Hinduism, Yajña or Yagna (Sanskrit: यज्ञ, lit. 'act of devotion, worship, offering in fire', IAST: yajña), also known as Havana in modern contexts, is a ritual done in front of a sacred fire (agni), often with mantras. Yajna has been a Vedic tradition, described in a layer of Vedic literature called the Brahmanas, as well as in the Yajurveda. The tradition has evolved from offering oblations and libations into sacred fire to symbolic offerings in the presence of said sacred fire.

Texts related to Yajna rituals have been called the Karma-kanda (ritual works) portion of the Vedic literature, in contrast to the Jnana-kanda (knowledge) portion found in the Vedic Upanishads. The proper completion of Yajna-like rituals was the focus of Mimansa school of Hindu philosophy. Yajnas have continued to play a central role in Hindu rites of passage, such as weddings. Modern major Hindu temple ceremonies, Hindu community celebrations, or monastic initiations may also include Vedic Yajna rites, or alternatively be based on Agamic rituals.

== Etymology ==
The word yajna (Sanskrit: यज्ञ, romanized: yajña) derives from the Sanskrit yaj, meaning 'to worship, adore, honour, revere' and appears in early Vedic literature, composed during the 2nd millennium BCE. In the Rigveda, the Yajurveda (itself a derivative of this Sanskrit root), and other texts, the word denotes "worship, devotion to anything, prayer and praise, an act of worship or devotion, a form of offering or oblation, and sacrifice". In post-Vedic literature, the term came to mean any form of rite, ceremony, or devotion with an actual or symbolic offering or effort.

A yajna could include major ceremonial devotions, with or without a sacred fire, and was sometimes accompanied by feasts and community events. According to Nigal, the term has a threefold meaning: worship of the deities (devapujana), unity (sangatikarana), and charity (dána).

The Sanskrit word is related to the Avestan term yasna of Zoroastrianism. Unlike the Vedic yajna, however, Yasna refers to a specific religious service, rather than a class of rituals, and it is associated with water rather than fire. The Sanskrit word is further related to Ancient Greek ἅζομαι (házomai), "to revere", deriving from the Proto-Indo-European root *Hyeh₂ǵ- ("to worship").

== Historical and archaeological background ==
The practice of yajna is generally traced to a common ritual inheritance shared by the early Indo-Iranian peoples, reflected in the linguistic relationship between Sanskrit "yajna" and Avestan "yasna" discussed above.

Some scholars have argued for a still older continuity, proposing that certain fire-altar structures uncovered at Indus Valley Civilisation sites such as Kalibangan and Lothal may represent early forms of domestic or communal fire ritual; this interpretation remains contested, and other scholars caution that the evidence is too fragmentary to establish direct continuity with water Vedic sacrificial practice.

By the time of the Rigveda (2nd millennium BCE), yajna was already a fully developed institution centred on the sacred fire, and its vocabulary and structure continued to develop through the Brahmana and Srauta Sutra literature over the following centuries.

=== Vedic period ===
Yajña was the central focus of the Rig Vedic period, with the Ṛgveda Saṁhitā serving as the foundational and oldest source for these rituals. The ritual centered around Agni, the god of fire, who served as the divine messenger and intermediary between heaven and earth. During the ceremony, hymns, prayers, and mantras were chanted while oblations (such as wood and clarified butter) were offered into the sacred flames. These offerings were viewed as a form of hospitality provided to the gods, who were treated as divine guests. Agni, acting as the havyavāhan (oblation-bearer), carried these offerings to the gods in the skies. In this spiritual exchange, the gods were pleased by the worship and, in turn, were expected to grant the worshippers "fruits" or boons such as wealth, prosperity, and healthy offspring.

The Vedic text Satapatha Brahmana defines a sacrifice as an act of abandonment of something one holds of value, such as oblations offered to god and dakshina (fees, gifts) offered during the yajna. For gifts and fees, the text recommends giving cows, clothing, horses or gold. The oblations recommended are cow milk, ghee, seeds, grains, flowers, water, and food cakes (rice cake, for example). Similar recommendations are repeated in other texts, such as in the Taittiriya Shakha 2.10 of the Krishna Yajurveda).

In the householder's daily ritual, Malamoud notes that the five great sacrifices (mahayajnas) were the "devayajna" (to the gods), the "pitryajna" (to the ancestors), the "bhutayajna" (to the beings), the "manusyayajna" (to human beings), and the "brahmayajna" (to the Vedas). The brahmayajna includes individual recitation of the Veda (svadhyaya). Bhutayajna includes food left for other creatures, and the manusyayajna includes hospitality to a guest.

The nature of Vedic sacrifice and rituals evolved over time, with major changes during the 1st millennium BCE, changes that influenced concepts later adopted by other traditions such as Buddhism. Early Vedic period offerings involved animal sacrifice, but the rituals were progressively reinterpreted over time, substituting the offerings and making it non-violent or symbolic, with the superiority of knowledge and celebration of sound of mantra replacing the physical offerings.

=== Upanishads ===
In early Upanishads, states Sikora, the meaning of the term Yajna evolved from "ritual sacrifice" performed around fires by priests, to any "personal attitude and action or knowledge" that required devotion and dedication. Ultimately, the external rituals were reformulated and replaced with "internal oblations performed within the human body". These ideas of substitution, evolution from external actions (karma-kanda) to internal knowledge (jñana-kanda), were highlighted in many rituals-related sutras, as well as specialized texts such as the Brihadaranyaka Upanishad, Chandogya Upanishad, Kaushitaki Upanishad, and Pranagnihotra Upanishad.

The oldest principal Upanishads, such as the Chandogya Upanishad (~700 BCE) in chapter 8, for example state,

अथ यद्यज्ञ इत्याचक्षते ब्रह्मचर्यमेव
तद्ब्रह्मचर्येण ह्येव यो ज्ञाता तं
विन्दतेऽथ यदिष्टमित्याचक्षते ब्रह्मचर्यमेव
तद्ब्रह्मचर्येण ह्येवेष्ट्वात्मानमनुविन्दते ॥ १ ॥

What is commonly called Yajna is really the chaste life of the student of sacred knowledge,
for only through the chaste life of a student does he who is a knower find that,
What is commonly called Istam (sacrificial offering) is really the chaste life of the student of sacred knowledge,
for only having searched with chaste life of a student does one find Atman (Soul, Self) ||1 ||

— Chandogya Upanishad 8.5.1

The Mundaka Upanishad classifies the four Vedas and six Vedangas as lower knowledge, and the higher for the knowledge of the imperishable. It compares the sacrificial rites to frail boats, holds that the heavenly worlds obtained through them lasts until its merit is spent, and directs the seeker to a teacher, since the uncreated cannot be attained through works. Diana Eck describes the Upanishadic "crossing over" as the soul's transition towards Brahman through knowledge imparted by a guru.

The Shvetashvatara Upanishad in verses 1.13-16, for example, uses the analogy of fire-making to describe meditation as a means of perceiving God and compares the self (atman) to fire latent within the fire-drills. It states, "by making one's own body as the lower friction sticks, the syllable Om as the upper friction sticks, then practicing the friction of meditation, one may see the Deva who is hidden, as it were".

=== Mahabharata ===
In the Mahabharata, the transition from one age (yuga) to the next is marked by a yajna.

The Bhagavad Gita reinterprets yajna through the "wheel of sacrifice," or yajnachakra. According to Angelika Malinar, this "wheel of sacrifice" represents a cycle of mutual dependence in which sacrifice is necessary to sustain relationships "regarded as the basis of life." Jayashree Sathe similarly reads the Bhagavad Gita as extending the concept of yajna beyond the literal ritual offerings of oblations into a sacrificial fire, to encompass the performance of one's prescribed duties (niyata-karma) without attachment to their results. In this sense, sacrifice takes the form of giving up attachment to the fruits of one's actions as well as one's ego.

=== Buddhism ===
Scholar of Buddhism Tadeusz Skorupski states that these sacrifices were a part of ritual way of life, and considered to have inherent efficacy, where doing these sacrifices yielded repayment and results without the priests or gods getting involved. These Vedic ideas, adds Skorupski, influenced "the formulation of Buddhist theory of generosity". Buddhist ideas went further, criticizing "the Brahmins for their decadence and failure to live in conformity with the Brahmanic legacy of the ancient Brahmins", who claimed the Vedic ancients "lived in self restraint, were ascetics, had no cattle, no gold, and no wealth". The Buddha sought return to more ancient values, states Tadeusz Skorupski, where the Vedic sages "had study as their grain and wealth, guarded the holy life as their treasure, praised morality, austerity and nonviolence; they performed sacrifices consisting of rice, barley and oil, but they did not kill the cows".

== Types ==
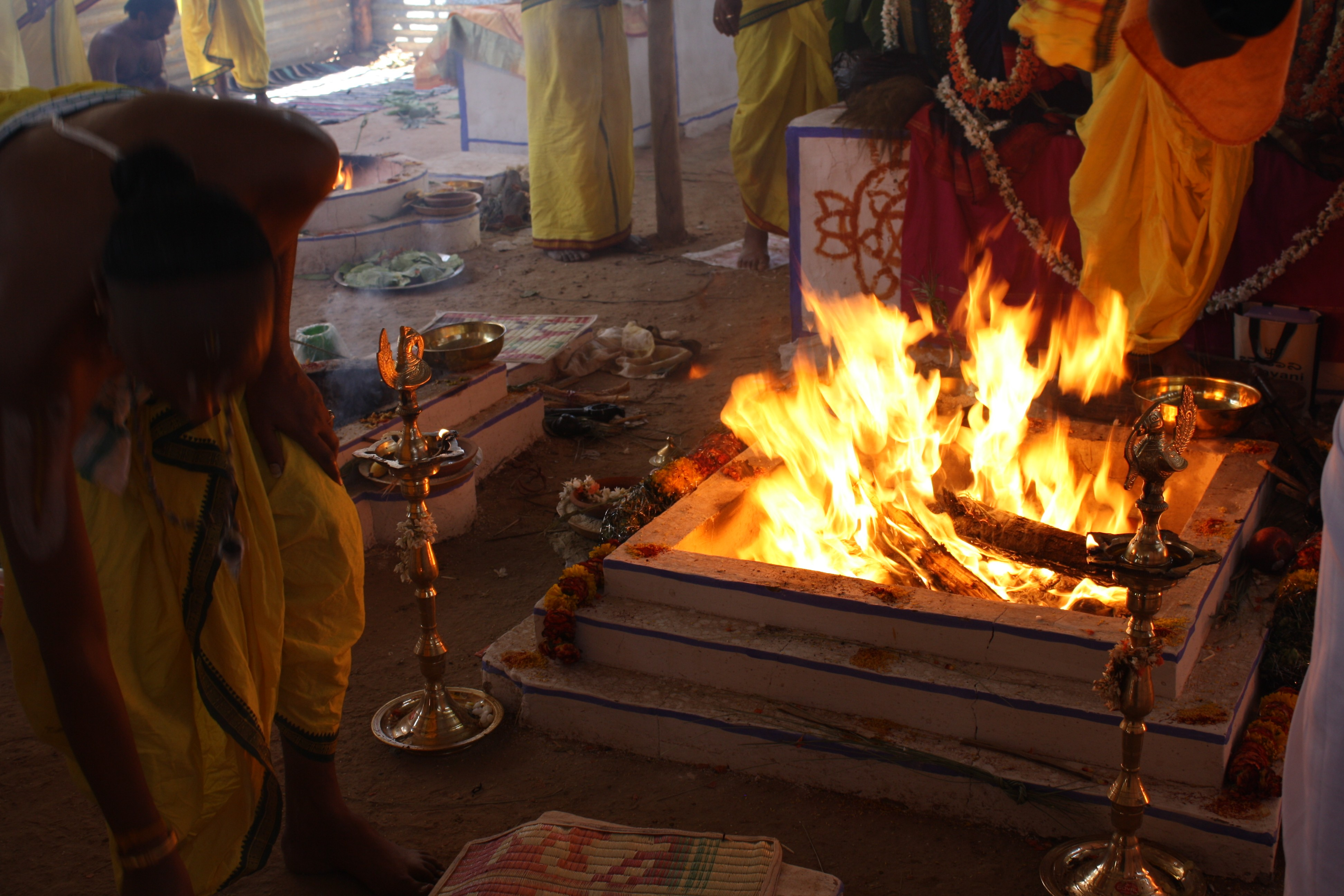
Priests performing Vedic yajña at Vishnu Kunda in Thirumakudalu Narasipura

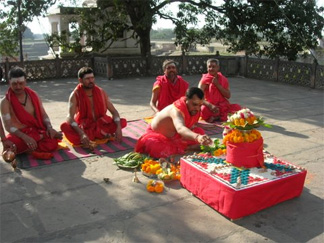
Old Durga Mandir, Banaras

Different types of yajna

The Kalpa Sutras classify yajnas in several ways. The broadest division is between srauta (public) yajnas and grhya (domestic) yajnas.

=== Śrauta yajnas ===
The older, śrauta yajnas are public sacrifices derived from the śruti that require the maintenance of three sacred fires, and participation of multiple specialized priests. Śrauta rites are called solemn rites and were dedicated to Agni and Soma. Although the significance of srauta rituals is not clear, they are discussed in three main categories: iṣṭi or haviryajña, which involve oblations of rice or barley; animal sacrifices or paśubandha; and soma, which involve oblations prepared from the soma plant. The main sources for these rites are the Srauta Sutras, each belonging to a particular Vedic school and describing the role of priests in the rituals of that school.

=== Gṛhya yajnas ===
Gṛhya yajnas are domestic rituals performed by householders using a single sacred fire and priest. They encompass daily offerings and rites of passage (samskaras), including ceremonies marking birth, marriage, and death. In Hindu weddings for example, a yajna is performed in which the sacrificial fire serves as a witness of the marriage, and the couple walk around the fire. Domestic rites are also performed for activities such as vows, seasonal ceremonies, and protection from danger.

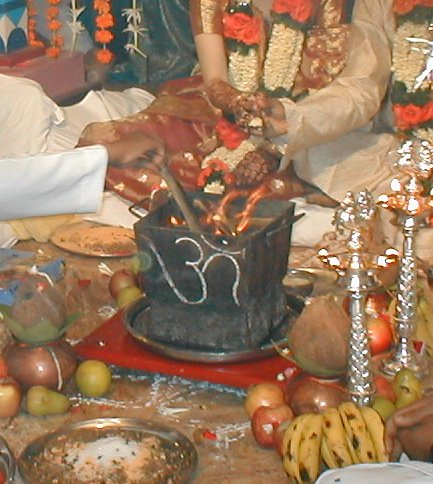
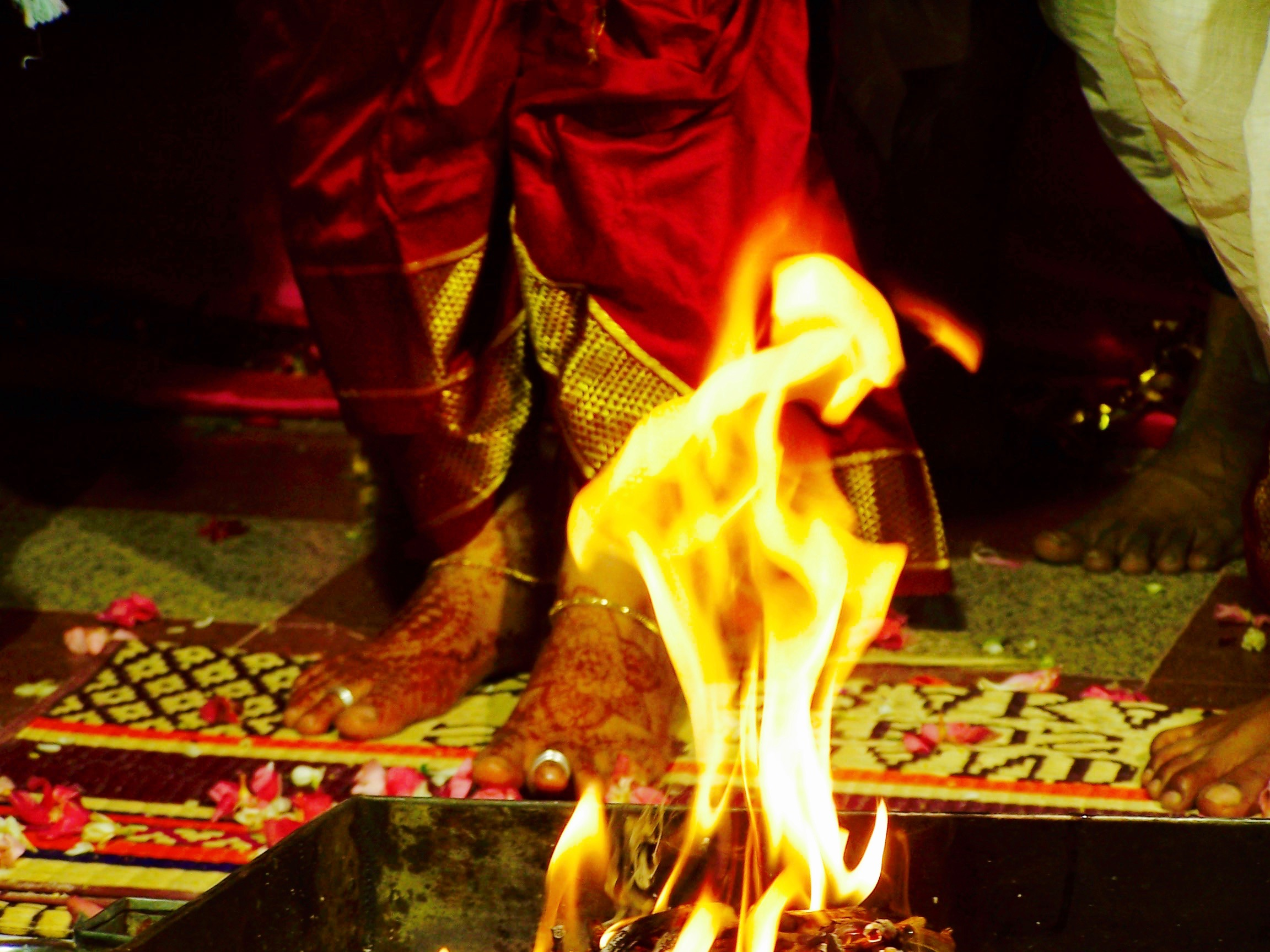
A Vedic Yajna plays a central role in Hindu weddings.

== Core elements ==
=== Fire ===
The central element of all Vedic sacrifices is the ritual fire which is identified as both an element as well as the Hindu fire god, Agni. Agni serves as a medium through which offerings are conveyed to the gods. The fire altar is seen as a passage between the earthly and divine realms, with the gods present within the sacrificial arena and worshippers' prayers raised toward heaven. Agni also serves as a witness in domestic rituals such as Hindu marriage.

=== Mantras ===
Mantras are metrical texts that are usually recited, muttered, or chanted and are an essential element to yajnas. According to Andrè Padoux, mantras are essential to accomplishing the sacrifice and contribute to its efficacy. Such mantras comprise of hymns (rc), sacrificial formulas (yajus) or chants (sāman).

=== Offerings and style ===
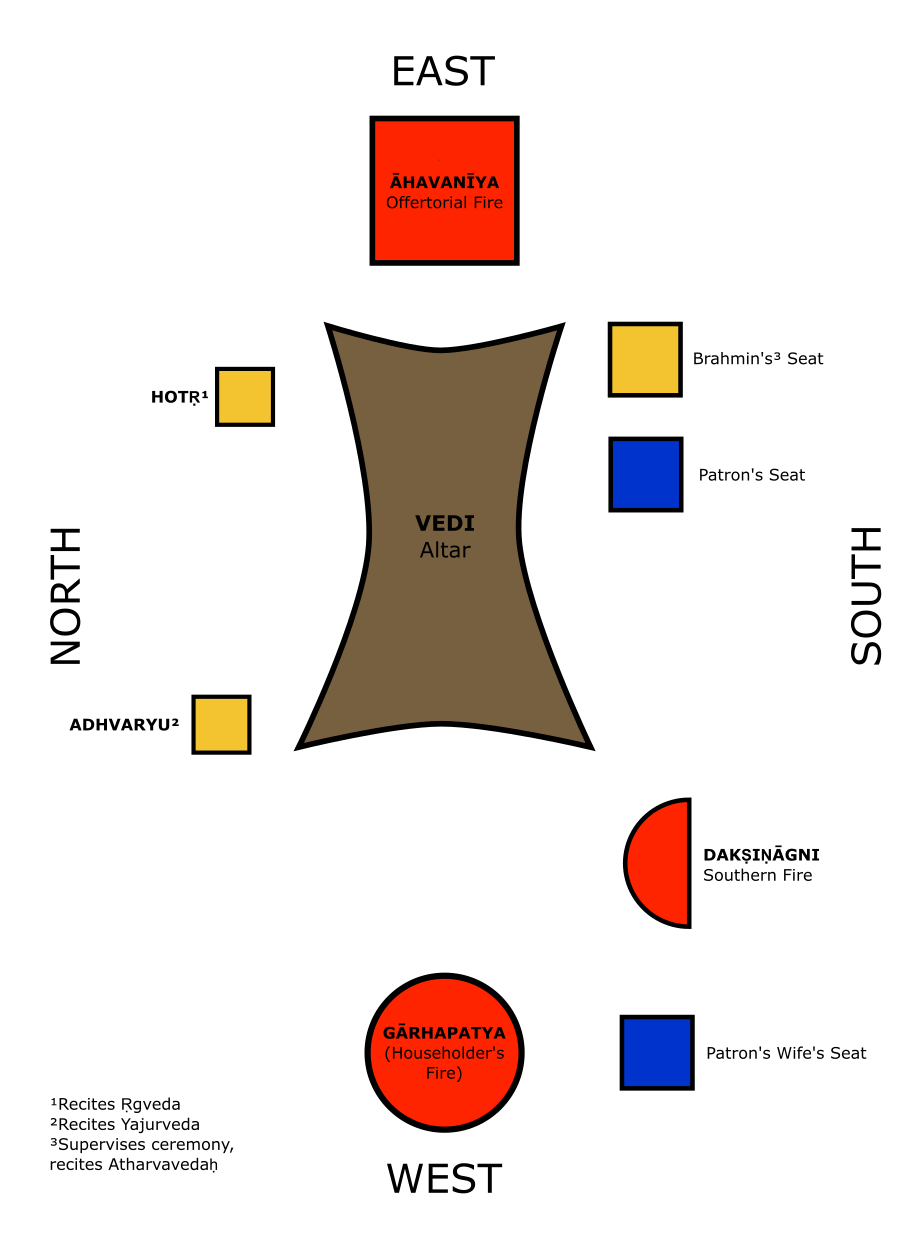
Typical sacrificial space used in Vedic yajnas with officiants

Oblations are offered into the fire. Among the ingredients offered as oblations in the yajna are ghee, milk, grains, cakes and soma. Offerings depended on the type of yajna conducted. For example, the Agnihotra, one the simplest srauta rituals uses milk as its main oblation. Yajnas where milk products, fruits, flowers, cloth and money are offered are called homa or havan.

The duration of a yajna depends on its type, some last only a few minutes whereas others are performed over a period of hours, days or even months. Some yajnas were performed privately, while others were community events. In other cases, yajnas were symbolic, such as in the Brihadaranyaka Upanishad hymn 3.1.6, where "the mind is the Brahmin of sacrifice" and the goal of sacrifice was complete release and liberation (moksha).

The blessings offered ranged from long life, gaining friends, health and heaven, more prosperity, to better crops.

=== Participants ===
Shrauta yajnas are typically performed by four priests: the Hota, the Adhvaryu, the Udgata and the Brahma. The Hota is the chief priest who recites invocations and litanies drawn from the Rigveda. The Adhvaryu assists in the physical performance of the ritual like measuring the ground, building the altar explained in the Yajurveda, and offering oblations. The Udgata chants hymns from the Samaveda, while the Brahma is the superintendent of the entire performance, and is responsible for correcting mistakes by using supplementary verses from the Atharva Veda. Domestic (grhya) yajnas are usually performed by one priest.

The sacrifice is sponsored by a patron known as the yajamana or "sacrificer", who is often accompanied by his wife, the yajmanapatni. The ritual is usually performed on behalf of the yajamana by the Adhvaryu priest, although the yajamana may perform the rituals on his own.

=== Method ===
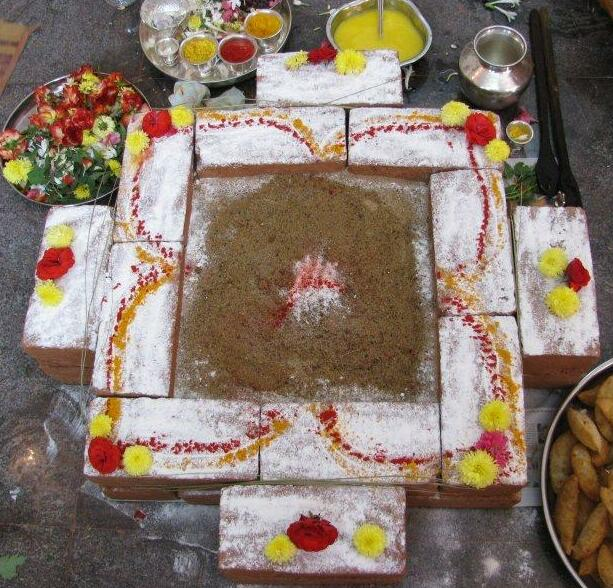
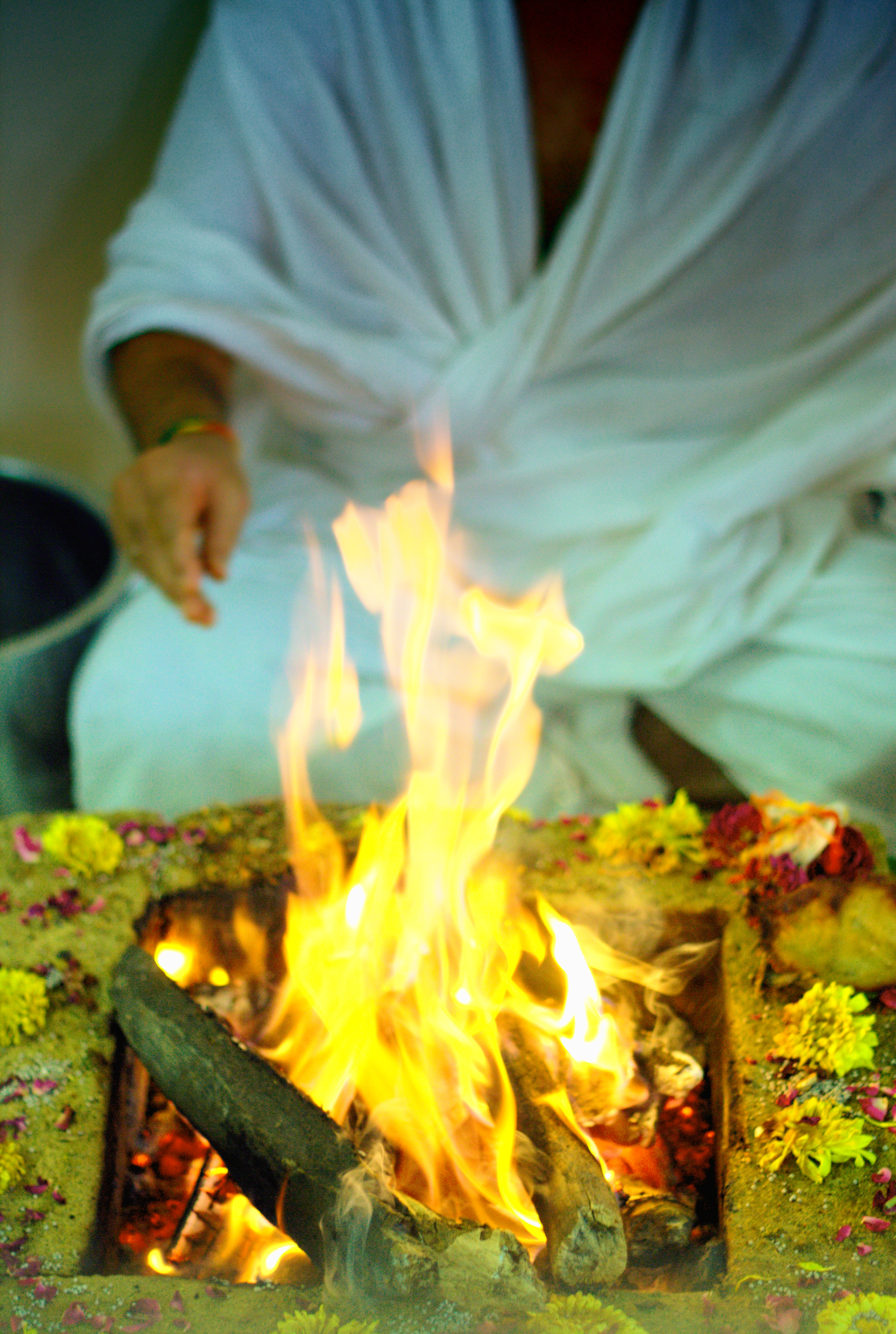
A Yajna Vedi (square altar) with Samagri (offerings) on left, and a Yajna in progress (right)

The Vedic yajna ritual is performed in the modern era on a square altar called Vedi (Bedi in Nepal), set in a mandapa or mandala or kundam, wherein wood is placed along with oily seeds and other combustion aids. However, in ancient times, the square principle was incorporated into grids to build large complex shapes for community events. Thus a rectangle, trapezia, rhomboids or "large falcon bird" altars would be built from joining squares. The geometric ratios of these Vedi altar, with mathematical precision and geometric theorems, are described in Shulba Sutras, one of the precursors to the development of mathematics in ancient India. The offerings are called Samagri (or Yajāka, Istam). The proper methods for the rites are part of Yajurveda, but also found in Riddle Hymns (hymns of questions, followed by answers) in various Brahmanas. When multiple priests are involved, they take turns as in a dramatic play, where not only are praises to gods recited or sung, but the dialogues are part of a dramatic representation and discussion of spiritual themes.

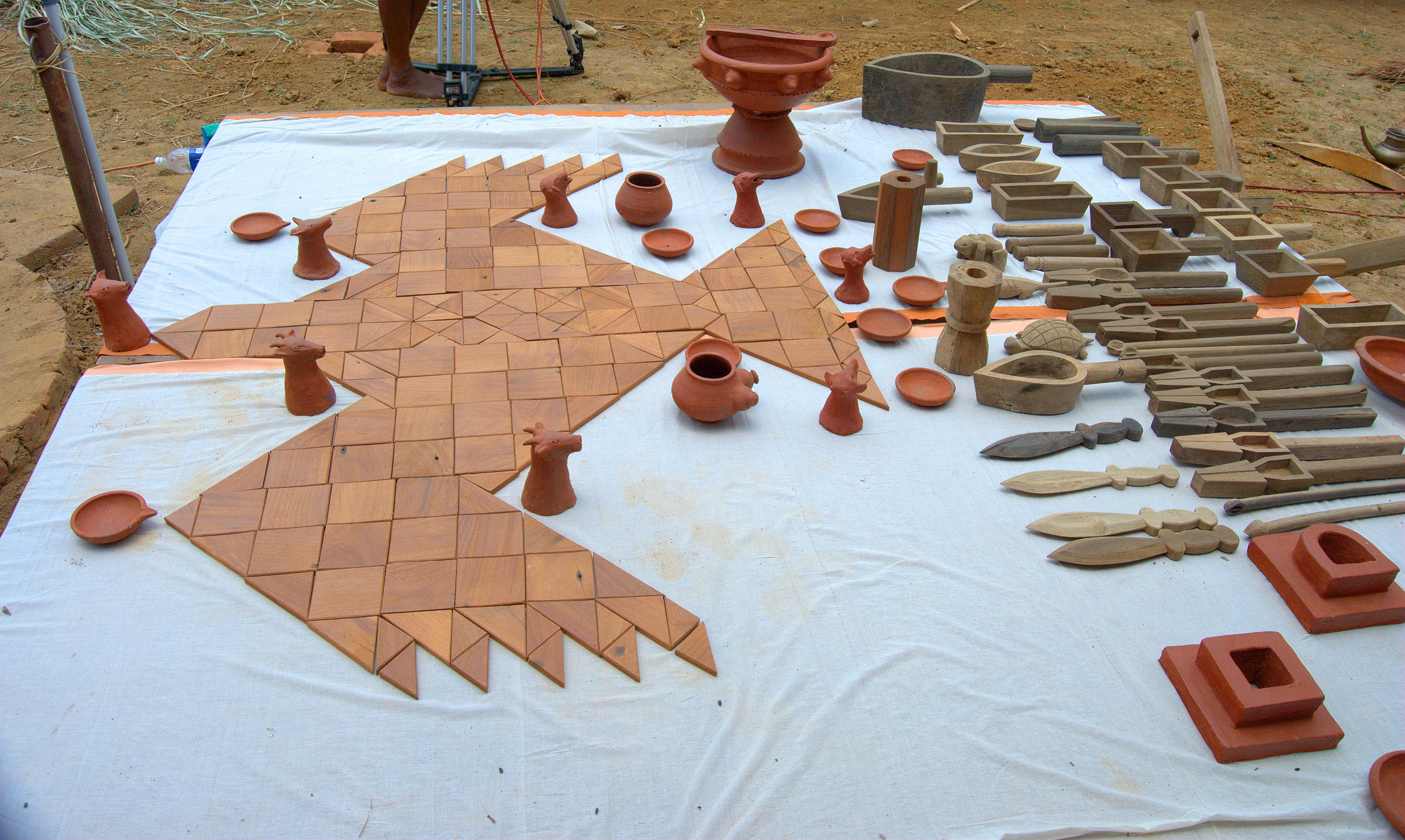
A miniature illustration of a falcon bird Athirathram yajna altar built using the square principle

The Brahmodya Riddle hymns, for example, in Shatapatha Brahmana's chapter 13.2.6, is a yajna dialogue between a Hotri priest and a Brahmin priest, which would be played out during the yajna ritual before the attending audience.

== Major yajnas ==
Alongside the domestic and periodic sacrifices described above, Vedic literature describes a number of large, occasion-specific yajnas, several of which were historically associated with kingship and social status.

=== Ashvamedha ===
The ''Ashvamedha'', or horse sacrifice, was a year-long royal rite in which a consecrated horse was released to wander freely, followed by armed attendants, before being ritually offered at the rite's conclusion; performing it successfully was understood to confirm and publicly proclaim a king's sovereignty. The rite is elaborated in the Shrauta Sutras and forms the basis of the article Ashvamedha.

=== Rajasuya and Vajapeya ===
The Rajasuya was a royal consecration sacrifice performed at a king's accession, while the Vajapeya combined chariot-race and Soma-offering elements said to confer increased status on the sacrificer.

=== Agnichayana ===
The Agnichayana is among the most elaborate Shrauta rituals and one of the few to have been documented in full ethnographic detail in modern times. In April 1975, a twelve-day performance of the Agnichayana was conducted by Nambudiri Brahmins in Panjal, Kerala, and recorded on film and in writing by the Indologist Frits Staal, resulting in the two-volume study Agni: The Vedic Ritual of the Fire Altar (1983). The 1975 performance was notable for involving no animal immolation, the tradition having substituted symbolic offerings in its place; the study remains a primary scholarly reference for the practical conduct of a full Shrauta sacrifice and was reviewed as a major contribution to the ethnographic study of Vedic ritual.

== Animal sacrifice and its reinterpretation ==
The role of animal offerings in Vedic sacrifice is a subject of ongoing scholarly and sectarian discussion. Some Rigvedic verses have historically been read by certain commentators as describing the offering of cattle in sacrificial contexts. Historians of religion generally hold that animal sacrifice formed part of some Vedic yajnas in the early period, and that its role diminished over the course of the 1st millennium BCE as rituals were increasingly reinterpreted with substituted or symbolic offerings.

A separate line of interpretation, associated with traditional Mimamsa commentary and some modern practitioners, holds that Vedic terms conventionally read as referring to animal victims carry symbolic or figurative meanings, and disputes that literal animal sacrifice was ever the intended sense of the relevant verses. Twentieth-century ethnographic evidence, such as the 1975 Nambudiri Agnichayana described above, documents the continued performance of major Shrauta rituals with no animal immolation, using grain and other substitute offerings instead.

Buddhist and Jain sources from the mid-1st millennium BCE criticised the animal sacrifice associated with contemporary Brahmanical ritual, contrasting it with an idealised memory of earlier Vedic sages said to have performed sacrifices using only grain and ghee.

== See also ==
- Historical Vedic religion
- Puja
- Sacrifice

== Sources ==
- Deussen, Paul (1997). Sixty Upanishads of the Veda. Motilal Banarsidass. ISBN 978-81-208-1467-7.
- Kapoor, Subodh (2002). "The Indian Encyclopaedia". Indian Encyclopaedia. Vol. 1. Cosmo Publications. p. 7797. ISBN 978-81-7755-257-7.
- Malamoud, Charles (1996). Cooking the World: Ritual and Thought in Ancient India. Oxford University Press. ISBN 978-0-19-563558-4.
- Nigal, Sahebrao Genu (1986). Axiological approach to the Vedas. New Delhi: Northern book centre. ISBN 81-85119-18-X.
- Olivelle, Patrick (1998). The Early Upanishads: Annotated Text and Translation. Oxford University Press. ISBN 978-0-19-535242-9.
- Plofker, Kim (2009). Mathematics in India. Princeton University Press. pp. 16–27. ISBN 978-0691120676.
- Prasoon, Shrikant (2008). Indian scriptures: Vedic literature and Hindu religion. New Delhi: Hindoology Books. ISBN 978-81-223-1007-8.
- Sikora, Jack (2002-09-18). Religions of India: A User Friendly and Brief Introduction to Hinduism, Buddhism, Sikhism, and the Jains. iUniverse. ISBN 978-1-4697-1731-9.
- Staal, Frits; Somayajipad, Cherumukku Vaidikan (1983). Agni, the Vedic Ritual of the Fire Altar. Berkeley: Asian Humanities Press. ISBN 0-89581-450-1.
- Staal, Frits (2009). Discovering the Vedas: Origins, Mantras, Rituals, Insights. Penguin Books. pp. 127–128.
- Staal, Frits (1996). Ritual and Mantras: Rules Without Meaning. Motilal Banarsidass Publishing House. ISBN 978-81-208-1412-7.
- Skorupski, Tadeusz (2016). Payne, Richard K.; Witzel, Michael (eds.). Homa Variations: The Study of Ritual Change Across the Longue Durée. Oxford University Press. ISBN 978-0-19-935158-9.
- Trivedi, Mehul Sureshkumar (August 2020). Yajña and Its Philosophy in Vedic Literature (PhD thesis). Vadodara, India: The Maharaja Sayajirao University of Baroda.
