= Eta Harich-Schneider =

German musician

Eta (Margarete) Harich-Schneider (née Schneider; 16 November 1894 – 10 January 1986) was a German harpsichordist, musicologist, Japanologist and writer.

== Life ==
Born in Oranienburg, Harich-Schneider later gave her year of birth as 1897, whereas her gravestone in Vienna-Hietzing reads "1894".

Harich-Schneider graduated from high school in 1915 and married the writer Walther Harich the same year (1888 - 1931), but she left him in 1922 (divorce). Harich-Schneider raised her daughters Lili and Susanne alone. Since the early 1920s, Eva Rechel-Mertens (the Proust translator) and Klabund were among her friends. She studied piano in Berlin with Conrad Ansorge. When she was already an established pianist, she took lessons with Wilhelm Klatte (1870-1930). In 1924, she made her debut at the first performance of Paul Hindemith's Suite 1922 at the Sing-Akademie zu Berlin. But she only moved finally from Frankfurt (Oder) to Berlin in 1927. From about 1929, she studied harpsichord with Günther Ramin in Leipzig and then until 1935 with Wanda Landowska in Paris (summer courses). In 1930, she first performed publicly as a harpsichordist in Berlin.

In 1930, she founded a fortnightly concert series of collegium for early music and began to study sources in the Staatsbibliothek zu Berlin, which led to her later book Die Kunst des Cembalo-Spiels. From 1932 to 1940, she was professor and head of the harpsichord class at the Hochschule für Musik in Berlin, where she also taught stylistics and chamber music.

In 1940 she was dismissed there (as a catholic antifascist) in connection with politically motivated conflicts. In 1941, Harich-Schneider took advantage of an invitation to go to Tokyo in order to escape the grip of Nazi power. There she gave concerts and taught. Some time later she began to study Japanese language, writing and music. She had a love affair with the "master spy" Richard Sorge, whose activities she knew.

After the war, she taught in Tokyo both at the U.S. Army College and in the Court Music Department of the Imperial House of Japan (1947 to 1949). She published two standard works on Japanese music. In 1949, she went to New York, where she attended Japanese Studies at Columbia University and Sociology at The New School for Social Research. She received an award for her master's thesis The relations of foreign and native elements in the development of Japanese music - a case study. 1955 - she became a Guggenheim Fellow in that year - she taught harpsichord at the Hochschule für Musik in Vienna until 1972. In 1968, she was also awarded the Austrian Cross of Merit for Science and Art. In Japan she received the high Imperial Japanese House Order Order of the Precious Crown in 1977.

Since 1941, Eta Harich-Schneider has also translated literary works from several languages into German, especially English (Shakespeare's sonnets).

Her harpsichord and clavichord students included Carla Henius, René Clemencic and Christiane Jaccottet.

In her autobiography Charaktere und Katastrophen, she reports on her efforts to resist the increasing influence of Nazi-oriented functionaries and musicians on the Berlin Hochschule für Musik by constitutional means until 1941. In addition, the book gives a nuanced account of the situation in the circle of Germans in Japan from 1941 until after 1945, not excluding human error, intrigue and tactical followers. It also reports on the situation of the Japanese population during the war (air raids).

But even at the university in Berlin she was only partially successful in the 1930s - in the end, as an anti-fascist-oriented Catholic, she was pushed aside by intrigues, which she describes in detail in her autobiography. After the war, she was one of the leading authorities on Japanese music, with close contacts to the Japanese imperial house.

Harich-Schneider died in Vienna in 1986 at the age of 92.

Her daughter Lili Harich (24 May 1916 - 1960) was a soprano and her younger daughter Susanne Kerckhoff (5 February 1918 - 1950) a writer.

== Work ==
Harich-Schneider wrote books on the technique of harpsichord playing and Japanese music. She has made recordings of Baroque music, such as the Goldberg Variations by Johann Sebastian Bach, BWV 988 in 1973 and the two-and three-part Inventions BWV 772-786 and 787–801, as well as recordings East Asian music.

During her time in Berlin, she raised the playing of early music to a new level: "One would probably have liked to leave the amateurs their joy in the undemanding playing of the rediscovered music of earlier centuries, but with almost religious fanaticism they forced their bawling opinions on professional musicians.

== Publications ==
- Die Kunst des Cembalo-Spiels, nach den vorhandenen Quellen dargestellt und erläutert, 4th edition, Bärenreiter Verlag, Kassel, 1979 (first in 1939)
- The harpsichord: an introduction to technique, style and the historical sources, 2nd edition, Kassel, Bärenreiter, 1973
- Charaktere und Katastrophen, Ullstein Verlag 1978 (Memoirs)
- A History of Japanese Music. Oxford University Press 1973
- Musikalische Impressionen aus Japan 1941–1957, Iudicium Verlag 2006
- Zärtliche Welt – François Couperin und seine Zeit, 1939
- Übersetzerin und Herausgeberin von Tomás de Santa Maria Wie mit aller Vollkommenheit und Meisterschaft das Klavichord zu spielen sei (first 1565), Leipzig, Kistner und Siegel, 1937, 2. Auflage 1986 (Anmut und Kunst beim Klavichordspiel, auch mit Übersetzung von Fray)
- Shakespeare Sonette in deutscher Sprache von Eta Harich-Schneider, Pekinger Pappelinsel 1944
- The Rhythmical Patterns in Gagaku and Bugaku (Leiden 1954, Brill)
- "Regional Folk Songs and Itinerant Minstrels in Japan”, Journal of the American Musicological Society, Nr. 10, 1957, S. 132 f.
- "The Last Remnants of a Mendicant Musicians Guild: The Goze in Northern Honshu (Japan)." Journal of the International Folk Music Council, 1959, 11, pp. 56–59.
