= Paul Jacoulet =

French printmaker (1896–1960)

Paul Jacoulet (1896–1960) was a French, Japan-based woodblock print artist known for a style that mixed the traditional ukiyo-e style and techniques developed by the artist himself.

== Biography ==
Jacoulet was born in Paris in 1896 and lived in Japan for most of his life. During World War II, he moved to Karuizawa, where he survived in the countryside by growing vegetables and raising poultry. During the occupation, at the request of General Douglas MacArthur, he was recruited by Commandant Charles McDowell to work at the Tokyo Army College. MacArthur would join Greta Garbo, Pope Pius XII and Queen Elizabeth II, as a prominent collector of Jacoulet's work.

Jacoulet prints are rare and often sell in the $5,000 to $20,000 range. The Parisian Lady, a print from 1934, sold for $25,000 at auction.

Jacoulet's creative period was from 1939 to 1960. He is considered one of the few western artists to have mastered the art of woodblock printing sufficiently to be recognized in Japan. His works are almost all of people, either portraits or full body images capturing some background details. He has had a number of exhibits in the years since his death including two at the Pacific Asia Museum in Pasadena (1983 and 1990), the Yokohama Art Museum (1996 and 2003), the Riccar Art Museum in Tokyo (1982), and the Isla Center for the Arts on Guam (1992 and 2006). He also achieved some recognition in his lifetime including an exhibit sponsored by the US Fifth Air Force (in 1946 according to Time magazine). Two complete catalogues of his woodblock prints exist (one in English and one in Japanese with some English) as well as exhibition books and posters from all his exhibits. The earliest book about him was written during his lifetime (Florence Wells (1957) Paul Jacoulet: Wood-Block Artist) and includes the original desperation prices for which he sold his work at that time.

Many prints are very rare because all Jacoulet's pre-World War II work that had not already been taken out of the country by collectors was destroyed by fire. Jacoulet was a true renaissance man: French but born and raised in Japan, expert in Kabuki, proficient on traditional Japanese musical instruments, a good calligrapher, conversant in several languages, and a recognized butterfly collector. Growing up in Tokyo he was the next door neighbor of ukiyo-e authority Yone Noguchi; he was taught English by Noguchi's American wife, Léonie Gilmour, and befriended their son, the young Isamu Noguchi. Jacoulet's father was an ambassador so Paul was widely traveled and was doted upon by his mother. She supported his artistic endeavors all her life. She believed that if French Polynesia was good for Paul Gauguin, then Jacoulet must go there too. She sent him away many winters from Japan to various islands in Micronesia, Indonesia, and the Philippines. Although his most valued works are from this part of the world, he also has a substantial number of prints with subjects from China, Korea, all areas of Japan, and Mongolia. Just one print depicts an American.

Jacoulet's works are also interesting to anthropologists. First because his subject matter was indigenous people in their traditional dress. In 1939 traditional people were the norm in his travels. Today his work is often used as a basis for reconstructing, for example, what Ainu traditional dress looked like by the Ainu themselves in their quest to reconnect with their cultural roots. Second, some of the subjects who posed for Jacoulet are still alive and they are currently being interviewed by a professor in Guam (Donald Rubinstein) to learn more about his artistic process.

Jacoulet was a shameless self-promoter and he sent prints to famous people to enhance his reputation. Jean MacArthur, Douglas's wife, received an annual Christmas gift and his work hung in the General's headquarters in Tokyo and later at the Waldorf-Astoria. Jacoulet was a flamboyant gay man at a very early date to be out, and his sexual orientation and gender fluidity are clearly reflected in his work. Near the end of his life Jacoulet was barred from entering the US due to his "undesirability" as a gay person. Undeterred, he dressed up in a white suit with a silver headed cane and walked into the US at Niagara Falls.

QAGOMA (Queensland Art Gallery and Gallery of Modern Art) held the exhibition "Birds of Passage" from 2024 until January 2026, juxtaposing Jacoulet with Ian Fairweather.
