= A Passage to India (play) =

1960 play by Santha Rama Rau

- Original language: English
- Written by: Santha Rama Rau
- Subject: Period
- Setting: India

Premiere
- Date: 1960
- Place: Oxford Playhouse

A Passage to India is a stage play written by Indian-American playwright Santha Rama Rau (1923–2009), based on E. M. Forster's 1924 novel of the same name.

== Synopsis ==
The play begins with two English women, Mrs. Moore and Adela Quested. They travel to 1920s India, where Mrs. Moore's son, Ronny, is working. Ronny is supposed to be engaged to Adela. The women hope to experience India while they are there. Adela and Ronny are unsure if they are meant to be together. While on a hike led by Dr. Aziz, Adela is attacked in the Marabar Caves. She assumes it was Dr. Aziz, but later while testifying in court, which becomes a media sensation, she realizes Dr. Aziz is not the person who attacked her. Dr. Aziz brings up the racial tensions he feels between the English and the Indians.

== Historical casting ==
Character	1960 West End cast	1962 Broadway cast	1965 Television cast	1984 Film cast
Mrs. Moore	Enid Lorimer	Gladys Cooper	Sybil Thorndike	Peggy Ashcroft
Adela Quested	Dilys Hamlett	Anne Meacham	Virginia McKenna	Judy Davis
Dr. Aziz	Zia Mohyeddin	Zia Mohyeddin	Zia Mohyeddin	Victor Banerjee

== Background ==
In the early 1950s, the play's creator, Santha Rama Rau, had dinner one evening with producer Cheryl Crawford. Crawford remarked to Rau that there had never been a distinguished play on Broadway before that dealt with India. This conversation brought up the E. M. Forster novel that was first published in 1924, titled A Passage to India. Rau mentioned to Crawford the possibility of her adapting the novel for the stage. In 1957, Rau met with Forster and presented him with a copy of her working script. Forster gave his blessing for her to move forward with the production and gave her several suggestions for changes in the script.

== Production history ==
The play was first staged by the Oxford Playhouse in January 1960. The play then went on a short tour with the same cast, before transferring to the Comedy Theatre on London's West End in April 1960. Forster attended the West End production and was pleased with it. He died in 1970.

The play next transferred to the Broadway stage, with a slightly different cast. The production opened in January 1962 and played for 109 performances, closing in May. The play received two Tony Award nominations, one for Best Lead Actress for Gladys Cooper, and one for Best Scene Design.

Director David Lean saw the play and was interested in making a film in the 1960s, but Forster refused to allow it to be made. Instead, he allowed a television production. This version, directed by Waris Hussein and adapted from the stage version, was transmitted on November 16, 1965 on BBC 1, as a part of the series Play of the Month.

In 1981, David Lean gained the rights to make a feature film based on the play. Filmed in 1983, and released in 1984, from a script almost entirely rewritten by Lean, the film received a largely positive reception from critics. The film was nominated for eleven Academy Awards, including Best Picture, and won two. Peggy Ashcroft won the Academy Award for Best Supporting Actress for her performance as Mrs Moore, and Judy Davis was nominated for Lead Actress. The film also won for Best Original Score.
