= Faubion Bowers =

American academic

Faubion Bowers (January 29, 1917 – November 17, 1999) was an American academic and writer in the area of Asian Studies, especially Japanese theatre. He also wrote the first full-length biography of Russian composer Alexander Scriabin. During the Allied Occupation of Japan, he was General Douglas MacArthur's personal Japanese language interpreter and assistant military secretary (although Bowers liked to call himself an aide-de-camp).

== Biography ==
Bowers was born in Miami, Oklahoma, having some Cherokee heritage. He was raised in Tulsa and briefly attended Columbia University in 1935. (Note: According to Samuel L. Leiter, some sources claim he graduated from Columbia in that year. A college journal from 1955 has him graduating in 1940. His obituary in the New York Times says he attended the University of Oklahoma, Columbia.) He then studied at the University of Poitiers and the École Normale de Musique, Paris, and in 1939 entered the Juilliard Graduate School of Music to train as a concert pianist. He became obsessed with the music of Alexander Scriabin, and became interested in Indonesian gamelan music which–it was said–had percussion influences on Scriabin's music.

Accordingly, aged twenty-three, he set out for Indonesia on a mail boat, but interrupted his journey to stay in Japan where he taught English at Hosei University in Tokyo from 1940 to 1941. There he became fascinated by kabuki theatre, having wandered into its most famous playhouse thinking it was a Buddhist temple. Suspected of being a spy, he continued his journey to Indonesia in 1941 and lectured for some months in Java. Returning to the United States he was drafted into the army, eventually rising to the rank of major. His language skills singled him out for intensive training, and he became a Japanese language interpreter and translator in the Pacific War.

Bowers was one of the few Caucasians who was "truly fluent" in Japanese during the war, and stated in 1941 at the start of hostilities that there were "only twenty-five American Hakujin (Caucasians) who could read, speak and write—more or less—the Japanese language". He was one of a team of four men, hand-picked by Lt. Colonel Sidney Mashbir of the Allied Translator and Interpreter Section, to translate top-secret documents recovered from the briefcase of Japanese Vice Admiral Shigeru Fukudome whose Kawanishi H8K flying boat crash-landed in the sea near Cebu in the Philippines on 31 March 1944. These documents included plans for Operation Z, and this "exquisite intelligence" was invaluable to US Navy in the forthcoming Battle of the Philippine Sea.

After the surrender of Japan, he was the interpreter for the advance party of 150 US personnel which flew into the Atsugi airfield on August 28, 1945. As MacArthur's interpreter he lived at the American Embassy (closed since 1941) with the Macarthur family, and served as interpreter at the initial meeting between MacArthur and Emperor Hirohito. While an official censor for Japanese theater he became its champion.

After the war he taught at the New School for Social Research, and at the University of Kansas as Distinguished Professor of Asian Studies. He also served as music editor or reviewer for various periodicals. Apart from Japanese he also spoke Russian, French, Chinese, Malay and Indonesian.

Bowers became a respected authority on Asian art and culture, writing scholarly monographs on such subjects as Indian dance and Japanese theatre, as well as a definitive two-volume biography of the Russian composer Alexander Scriabin. His book, Japanese Theatre, was published in 1952 and is highly recommended by James Michener, in his book on Japanese ukiyo-e prints, The Floating World, as "one of the foremost works of scholarship dealing with Japanese culture to come out of the occupation."

He was married from 1951–1966 to Indian writer Santha Rama Rau. They had one son, Jai, who, according to his parents, traveled widely and lived an affluent vagabond existence. Although married and the father of a son, he has been described as "one of a number of highly cultured gay military men...who served in Japan during the occupation and became enthusiasts of Japanese theatre, especially kabuki, and film."

Bowers was interviewed for Columbia University's Oral History Project in 1960. He wrote the first full-length biography of Russian composer Alexander Scriabin (1872–1915) in two volumes (1970, 2nd edition 1996) and was a member of the Bagby Foundation for the Musical Arts in New York City.

He died in New York City on November 17, 1999.

== Kabuki ==
Bowers is known as The Man Who Saved Kabuki in Japan. While on his way to Indonesia in 1940, he visited Tokyo's Kabuki-za where he watched the famous Kanadehon Chūshingura kabuki play, and was very moved by kabuki as an art form. Four years later he returned to Japan as General MacArthur's secretary during the American Occupation of Japan. At this time the Supreme Commander of the Allied Powers thought kabuki should be banned for its portrayal of feudal values. Bowers was strongly against this, stating that "Kabuki is not only Japanese culture but world culture and must be preserved for the future." He promoted kabuki plays and instructed that a "Dream Team" cast of big kabuki stars should be assembled to perform "Kanadehon Chūshingura" in 1947. This performance and many others performed at the Tokyo Army College were a success, and the cast later performed the play in 1950 in East Coast venues across the USS.

== Awards ==
Bowers was awarded the Bronze Star in 1944, and an Oak Leaf Cluster in 1945.

In 1984, Bowers was awarded the Order of the Sacred Treasure by the government of Japan, presented to him by Emperor Hirohito.

== Publications ==
- Bowers, Faubion (1952). Japanese theatre. New York: Hermitage House.
- Bowers, Faubion (1953). The Dance In India. New York: Columbia University Press.
- Bowers, Faubion (1954a). Japanese Theatre: Origin - Noh Drama - Puppets - Kabuki Spectacle. New York: Hermitage House.
- Bowers, Faubion; et al., eds. (1954b). "Perspective of Japan: An Atlantic Monthly Supplement". The Atlantic Monthly. New York: International Publishers.
- Bowers, Faubion (1980) [1956]. Theatre in the East (reprint ed.). Books for Libraries. ISBN 0-8369-9278-4.
- Bowers, Faubion (1959). Broadway USSR: Ballet, Theatre, and Entertainment in Russia Today. Thomas Nelson and Sons.
- Mishima, Yukio; Keene, Donald; Bowers, Faubion (1960). Kabuki. New York: Program Publishing Co.
- Champdor, Albert; Bowers, Faubion (trans.) (1966). The Book Of The Dead: Based on the Ani, Hunefer, and Anhai Papyri in the British Museum. New York: Garrett Publications.
- Bowers, Faubion; Fieger, Erwin (1972). Japan:Islands of the Rising Sun. New York: H. N. Abrams. ISBN 0-8109-0208-7.
- Bowers, Faubion (1974). The New Scriabin: Enigma and Answers. Newton Abbot: David & Charles. ISBN 978-0-7153-6578-6.
- Sarabhai, Mrinalini; Mitchell, John D.; Bowers, Faubion (1992). Staging a Sanskrit Classic: Bhasa's Vision of Vasavadatta. New York: Fordham University Press. ISBN 978-1-882763-02-3.
- Iyengar, K.R. Srinivasa; Meserve, Walter J.; Meserve, Ruth L.; Bowers, Faubion (1995). Appreciations of Asif Currimbhoy. Calcutta: Writers' Workshop. ISBN 81-7189-299-X.
- Bowers, Faubion (1996). Scriabin, a Biography (2nd, revised ed.). New York: Courier Dover Publications. ISBN 978-0-486-28897-0. (1st pub. 1970)
- Bowers, Faubion (1996). The Classic Tradition of Haiku: An Anthology. Dover Publications. ISBN 0-486-29274-6.
