= Tokyo Army College =

The Tokyo Army College (also known as the Tokyo Army Educational Center) was established by the Eighth U.S. Army during its Occupation of Japan and became a center of educational and cultural activities for members of the occupational forces and Japanese citizens alike.

From 1947 to 1948, the Tokyo Army College was led by Captain Charles T. McDowell, whose staff included Chisaburo Yamada, the well known Japanese art expert, author, and future director of the National Museum of Western Art, and Faubion Bowers, who also served as General Douglas MacArthur's personal interpreter and aide-de-camp during the occupation and later became a respected authority on Oriental art and culture. Bowers is known in Japan as "the man who saved kabuki" because he advocated successfully for the preservation of this form of art when General MacArthur held the view that it should be banned due to its portrayal of feudal values.

== Theatrical productions ==
During the occupation of Japan, the Tokyo Army College produced numerous plays, many of which belonged to the Kabuki tradition, performed by some of the most famous Kabuki actors in Japan. Playbills for these productions are considered collector's items and are available through certain rare books dealers.

- July 2, 1946 - Two Kabuki Dramas, including Benten Musume Meo no Shiranami and Kanjinchō (both starring Onoe Kikugoro, Nakamura Kichiemon, and Matsumoto Kōshirō VII).
- May 28, 1947 - Two Kabuki Dramas, including "Imparting of the Secret Art of Calligraphy" from the historical play Sugawara Denju (starring Matsumoto Kōshirō VII, Nakamura Shikan, Nakamura Kichiemon, Nakamura Tokizo, Nakamura Kichinojo, and Ichikawa Somegoro) and the Kabuki comedy Migawari Zazen (starring Onoe Kikugoro, Bandō Mitsugorō VIII, and Ichikawa Omezo).
- June 11, 1947 - A Noh play at the Somei Noh Theater
- October 1, 1947 - Two Bunraku performances, including Chikagoro Kawara no Tatehiki and Michiyuki Hatsunetabi, performed at the Tokyo Gekyo Theatre.

== Musical Productions ==
- June 1, 1947 - Piano Concert by Tatsue Tanaka
- June 11, 1947 - Vocal Concert "Hugo Wolf Evening" by Teiichi Nakayama
- June 15, 1947 - Piano Concert by Koji Taku
- June 22, 1947 - Choral Concert by the Ueno Academy of Music
- June 29, 1947 - Piano Concert by Professor Paul Vinogradoff

== Art exhibitions ==
- June 12–14, 1947 - Modern French Painting
- June 16–18, 1947 - Japanese national treasures in the Okochi Collection
- June 19–25, 1947 - Japanese Wooden Sculpture

== Students and Faculty ==
- The renowned German artist Willy Seiler instructed American Army personnel in oil painting, life drawing and sketching at the Tokyo Army College in the late 1940s. General MacArthur is known to have sat for an etching by Seiler in 1951.
- The famed poet, novelist, ethnographer, and journalist Americo Paredes completed several courses at the Tokyo Army College prior to his return from Japan and subsequent enrollment at the University of Texas at Austin, where he earned his bachelor's degree.
- Woodblock print artist Paul Jacoulet was recruited by Commandant McDowell to serve as an art instructor at the Tokyo Army College in the late 1940s.
