= A Passage to India =

1924 novel by E. M. Forster

- First edition (UK)
- Author: E. M. Forster
- Language: English
- Genre: novel
- Set in: British India, c. 1910s
- Publisher: Edward Arnold, (UK); Harcourt Brace (US)
- Publication date: 4 June 1924
- Publication place: United Kingdom
- Media type: Print (hardback & paperback)
- OCLC: 59352597
- Dewey Decimal: 823.912
- LC Class: PR6011.O58 P3
- Text: A Passage to India at Wikisource

A Passage to India is a 1924 novel by English author E. M. Forster set against the backdrop of the British Raj and the Indian independence movement in the 1920s. It was selected as one of the 100 great works of 20th-century English literature by the Modern Library and won the 1924 James Tait Black Memorial Prize for fiction. Time magazine included the novel in its "All Time 100 Novels" list. The novel is based on Forster's experiences in India, deriving the title from Walt Whitman's 1870 poem "Passage to India" in Leaves of Grass.

The story revolves around four characters: Dr. Aziz, his British friend Mr. Cyril Fielding, Mrs. Moore, and Miss Adela Quested. During a trip to the fictitious Marabar Caves (modelled on the Barabar Caves of Bihar), Adela thinks she finds herself alone with Dr. Aziz in one of the caves (when in fact he is in an entirely different cave; whether the attacker is real or a reaction to the cave is ambiguous), and subsequently panics and flees; it is assumed that Dr. Aziz has attempted to assault her. Aziz's trial, and its run-up and aftermath, bring to a boil the common racial tensions and prejudices between Indians and the British during the colonial era.

== Plot ==
British schoolmistress Adela Quested and her elderly friend Mrs. Moore visit the fictional Indian city of Chandrapore. Adela is to decide if she wants to marry Mrs. Moore's son, Ronny Heaslop, the city magistrate.

Meanwhile, Dr. Aziz, a young Indian Muslim physician, is called from dining with friends by Major Callendar, Aziz's superior at the hospital, but is delayed. Disconsolate at finding him gone, Aziz walks back and enters his favourite mosque by impulse. Seeing Mrs Moore there, he yells at her not to profane this sacred place, but the two then chat and part as friends. When Mrs. Moore relates her experience later, Ronny becomes indignant at the native's presumption.

Because the newcomers had expressed a desire to meet Indians, Mr. Turton, the city tax collector, invites several to his house, but the party turns out awkwardly, due to the Indians' timidity and the Britons' bigotry. Also there is Cyril Fielding, principal of Chandrapore's government-run college for Indians, who invites Adela and Mrs. Moore to a tea party with him and a Hindu-Brahmin professor named Narayan Godbole. At Adela's request, he extends his invitation to Dr. Aziz.

At the party, Fielding and Aziz become friends and Aziz promises to take Mrs. Moore and Adela to see the distant Marabar Caves. Ronny arrives and, finding Adela "unaccompanied" with Dr. Aziz and Professor Godbole, rudely breaks up the party.

Aziz mistakenly believes that the women are offended that he has not followed through on his promise and arranges an outing to the caves at great expense to himself. Fielding and Godbole are supposed to accompany the expedition, but they miss the train. In the first cave they visit, Mrs. Moore is overcome with claustrophobia and is disturbed by the echo. When she declines to continue, Adela and Aziz climb the hill to the upper caves, accompanied by a guide.

Asked by Adela whether he has more than one wife, Aziz is disconcerted by her bluntness and ducks into a cave to compose himself. When he comes out, he is told by the guide that Adela has gone into a cave by herself. After quarreling with the guide, Aziz discovers Adela's field glasses broken on the ground and puts them in his pocket. He then looks down the hill and sees Adela speaking to Miss Derek, who has arrived with Fielding in a car. Aziz runs down and greets Fielding, but Miss Derek and Adela drive off, leaving Fielding, Mrs. Moore and Aziz to return to Chandrapore by train.

Aziz is arrested on arrival and charged with sexually assaulting Adela. The run-up to his trial increases racial tensions. Adela alleges that Aziz followed her into the cave and that she fended him off by swinging her field glasses at him. The only evidence is the field glasses in the possession of Aziz. When Fielding proclaims his belief in Aziz's innocence, he is ostracised and condemned as a blood-traitor.

While awaiting the trial, Mrs Moore becomes concerned at her failing health; taking a ship to England, she dies on the way. Then during the trial, Adela admits that she had been similarly disoriented by the cave's echo. She was no longer sure who or what had attacked her and, despite great demand to persist in her accusation, withdraws the charge. When the case is dismissed, Heaslop breaks off his engagement to Adela and she stays at Fielding's house until a return to England is arranged.

Although he is vindicated, Aziz is angry that Fielding befriended Adela after she nearly ruined his life. Believing it to be the gentlemanly thing to do, Fielding convinces Aziz not to seek monetary redress, but the men's friendship suffers and Fielding departs for England. Believing that he is leaving to marry Adela for her money, and bitter at his friend's perceived betrayal, Aziz vows never again to befriend a white person.

Two years later, Aziz has moved to the Hindu-ruled state of Mau and is now the Raja's chief physician by the time Fielding returns, married to Stella, Mrs. Moore's daughter from a second marriage. Though the two meet and Aziz still feels drawn to Fielding, he realises that they cannot be truly friends until India becomes independent from British rule.

== Characters ==
- Dr. Aziz : A young Muslim Indian physician who works at the British hospital in Chandrapore.
- Cyril Fielding : The 45-year-old, unmarried British headmaster of the small government-run college for Indians.
- Adela Quested : A young British schoolmistress who is visiting India with the vague intention of marrying Ronny Heaslop.
- Mrs. Moore : The mother of Ronny Heaslop.
- Ronny Heaslop : The British city magistrate of Chandrapore.
- Professor Narayan Godbole : A professor at Mr. Fielding's school. (pronounced god-boh-lay)
- Mr. Turton : The British city collector of Chandrapore.
- Mrs. Turton : Mr. Turton's openly racist wife.
- Maj. Callendar : The British head doctor and Aziz's superior at the hospital.
- Mr. McBryde : The British superintendent of police in Chandrapore.
- Miss Derek : An Englishwoman employed by a Hindu royal family who frequently borrows their car.
- Nawab Bahadur : The chief Indian citizen in Chandrapore.
- Hamidullah : Aziz's uncle.
- Amritrao : A prominent Indian lawyer called in to defend Aziz.
- Mahmoud Ali : A Muslim Indian barrister who openly hates the British.
- Dr. Panna Lal : A low-born Hindu doctor and Aziz's rival at the hospital.
- Ralph Moore : The second son of Mrs. Moore.
- Stella Moore: Mrs. Moore's daughter.
- Mr Haq: The inspector of police.

== Background ==
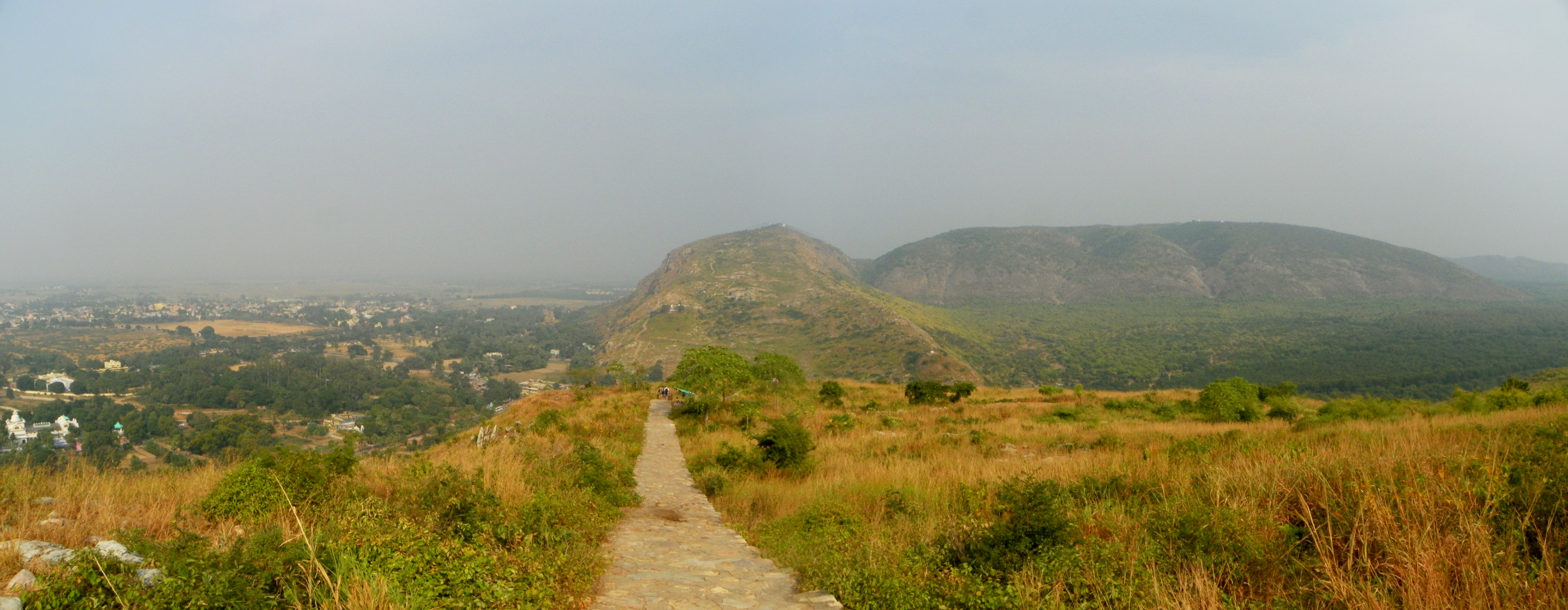
View of the Rajgir Hills, an inspiration for the fictional Marabar Hills.

A Passage to India is a reflection of Forster's visit to India in 1912–13 and his duration as private secretary to Tukojirao III, the Maharajah of Dewas Senior in 1921–22. He dedicated the book to his friend Ross Masood.

== Literary criticism ==
The nature of critiques of A Passage to India is largely based upon the era of writing and the nature of the critical work. While many earlier critiques found that Forster's book showed an inappropriate friendship between colonizers and the colonized, new critiques on the work draw attention to the depictions of sexism, racism and imperialism in the novel.

Reviews of A Passage to India when it was first published challenged specific details and attitudes included in the book that Forster drew from his own time in India. Early critics also expressed concern at the interracial camaraderie between Aziz and Fielding in the book. Others saw the book as a vilification of humanist perspectives on the importance of interpersonal relationships, and effects of colonialism on Indian society. More recent critiques by postcolonial theorists and literary critics have reinvestigated the text as a work of Orientalist fiction contributing to a discourse on colonial relationships by a European. Today it is one of the seminal texts in the postcolonial Orientalist discourse, among other books like Heart of Darkness, by Joseph Conrad, and Kim, by Rudyard Kipling.

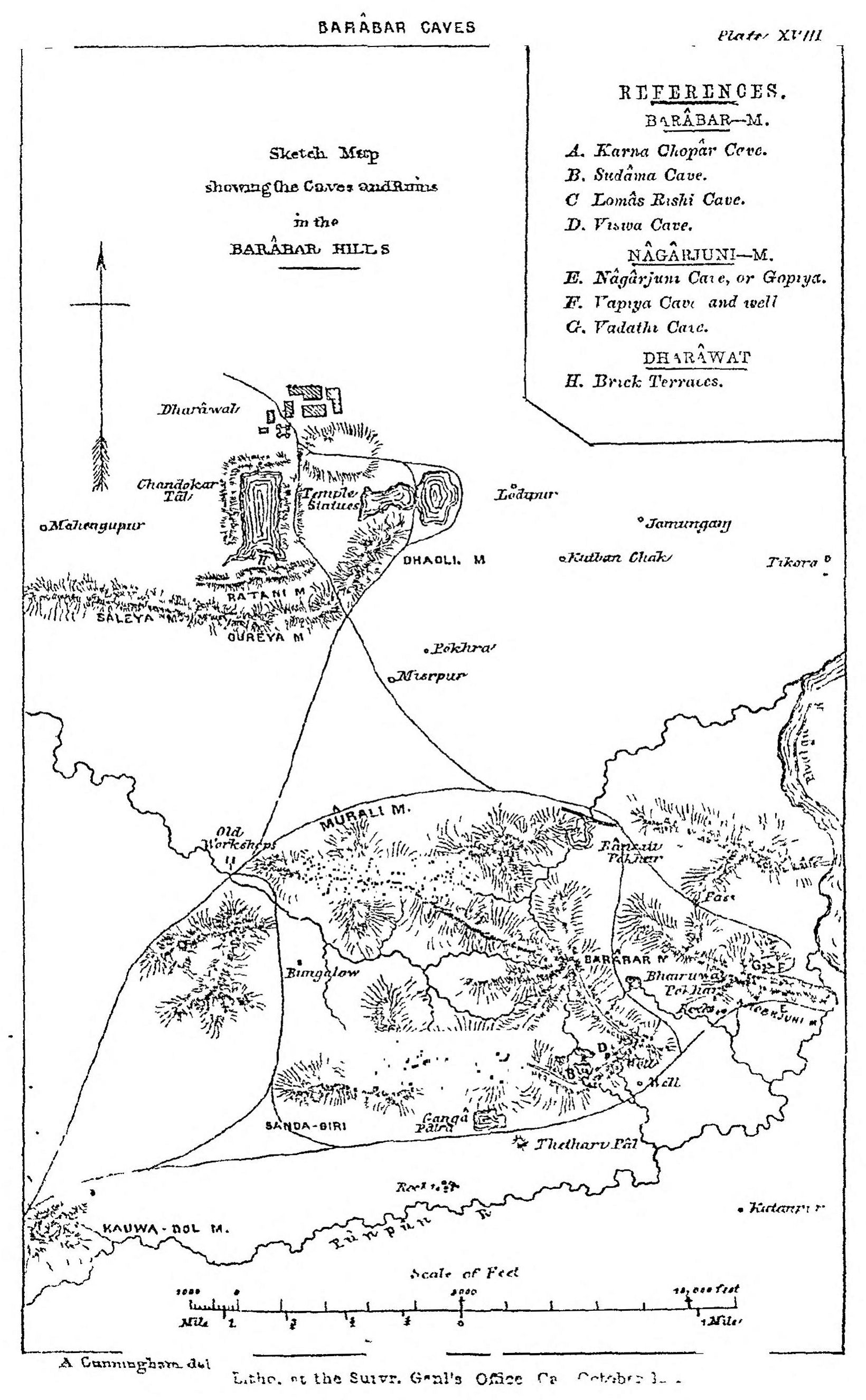
Plan of the Barabar Caves

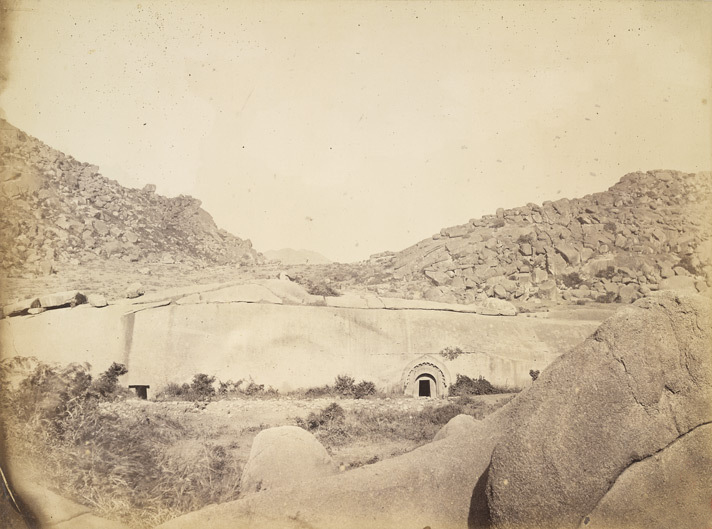
Entrance to the Barabar Caves

A Passage to India emerged at a time when portrayals of India as a savage, disorganized land in need of domination were more popular in mainstream European literature than romanticized depictions. Forster's novel departed from typical narratives about colonizer-colonized relationships and emphasized a more "unknowable" Orient, rather than characterizing it with exoticism, ancient wisdom and mystery. Postcolonial theorists like Maryam Wasif Khan have termed this novel a Modern Orientalist text, meaning that it portrays the Orient in an optimistic, positive light while simultaneously challenging and critiquing European culture and society. However, Benita Parry suggests that it also mystifies India by creating an "obfuscated realm where the secular is scanted, and in which India's long traditions of mathematics, science and technology, history, linguistics and jurisprudence have no place."

One of the most notable critiques comes from literary professor Edward Said, who referenced A Passage to India in both Culture and Imperialism and Orientalism. In his discussion about allusions to the British Empire in early 20th-century novels, Said suggests that though the work subverted typical views on colonialism and colonial rule in India, it also fell short of outright condemning either nationalist movements in India or colonialism itself. Of Forster's attitude toward colonizer-colonized relationships, Said says Forster:

. . . found a way to use the mechanism of the novel to elaborate on the already existing structure of attitude and reference without changing it. This structure permitted one to feel affection for and even intimacy with some Indians and India generally, but made one see Indian politics as the charge of the British, and culturally refused a privilege to India nationalism.

Stereotyping and Orientalist thought is also explored in postcolonial critiques. Said suggests that Forster deals with the question of British-Indian relationships by separating Muslims and Hindus in the narrative. He says Forster connects Islam to Western values and attitudes while suggesting that Hinduism is chaotic and orderless, and subsequently uses Hindu characters as the background to the main narrative. Said also identifies the failed attempt at friendship between Aziz and Fielding as a reinforcement of the perceived cultural distance between the Orient and the West. The inability of the two men to begin a meaningful friendship is indicative of what Said suggests is the irreconcilable otherness of the Orient, something that has originated from the West and also limits Western readers in how they understand the Orient.

Other scholars have examined the book with a critical postcolonial and feminist lens. Maryam Wasif Khan's reading of the book suggests A Passage to India is also a commentary on gender, and a British woman's place within the empire. Khan argued that the female characters coming to "the Orient" to break free of their social roles in Britain represent the discord between Englishwomen and their social roles at home, and tells the narrative of "pioneering Englishwomen whose emergent feminism found form and voice in the colony".

Sara Suleri has also critiqued the book's orientalist depiction of India and its use of racialized bodies, especially in the case of Aziz, as sexual objects rather than individuals.

== Awards ==
- 1924 James Tait Black Memorial Prize for fiction.
- 1925 Femina Vie Heureuse

== Adaptations ==
- In 1948, an adaptation by George Lefferts aired on NBC University Theatre, featuring Alma Lawton, Ben Wright, and Joseph Schildkraut as Dr. Aziz.
- A Passage to India (play), a play written by Santha Rama Rau based on the novel, ran on the West End in 1960 and on Broadway in 1962. A 1965 BBC television version of the play was broadcast in their Play of the Month series.
- The Indian filmmaker Satyajit Ray intended to direct a theatrical adaptation of the novel, but the project was never realised.
- The 1984 film version won two Oscars and numerous other awards.
- Martin Sherman wrote an additional version for the stage, that premiered at the Shared Experience in Richmond in 2002. It has toured the UK and played at the Brooklyn Academy of Music Harvey Theater in November 2004.
- Filmmaker Richie Mehta announced in November 2026 that he will make a five-part series for the BBC and CBC. The series will star Ali Fazal, Tom Mison, Fiona Shaw, Naseeruddin Shah and Shahana Goswami.

== Manuscript ==
In 1960, the manuscript of A Passage to India was donated to Rupert Hart-Davis by Forster and sold to raise money for the London Library, fetching the then record sum of £6,500 for a modern English manuscript.

== See also ==
- Stereotypes of South Asians
