= Kathy Stewart Award =

The Kathy Stewart Award is the highest honor bestowed in the Central Intelligence Agency's Office of General Counsel. The award, named for former CIA and State Department official Cynthia Kathleen Stewart (née McDowell), honors an employee "who reflects the highest standards of dedication to service, commitment to the rule of the law and genuine caring for others."

Notably, the 2006 recipient of the Stewart Award was Robert Eatinger, chief of legal affairs for the CIA's Counterterrorism Center. In December 2007, The New York Times reported that Eatinger was consulted by Jose Rodriguez, then Director of the National Clandestine Service before he allegedly destroyed two 2002 CIA interrogation videotapes documenting the use of enhanced interrogation techniques on two detainees. According to the Times article, Eatinger and another CIA attorney, Steven Hermes, advised Rodriguez that he "had the authority to destroy the tapes and that the destruction would violate no laws." Administration officials have suggested that Eatinger and Hermes most likely offered their advice under the expectation that Rodriguez would subsequently pursue further approvals, as would normally be the practice. Rodriguez has since resigned his position.
