= Santha Rama Rau =

American writer (1923–2009)

- Born: 24 January 1923; Madras, British India (now Chennai, India)
- Died: 21 April 2009 (aged 86); Amenia, New York, United States
- Education: Wellesley College, Wellesley, Massachusetts
- Spouse(s): Faubion Bowers (1951–1966; divorced); Gurdon Wattles (1970–1995; his death)
- Partner: ((Faubion Bowers))
- Writing career
- Genres: Travel writer, novelist, playwright
- Notable works: This is India (1953) (novel); A Passage to India (1960) (play adaptation)

Santha Rama Rau (24 January 1923 – 21 April 2009) was an Indian-born American writer.

== Early life and background ==
While Santha's father was a Konkani Chitrapur Saraswat Brahmin from Kanara. Her mother was a Kashmiri Brahmin from North India, who grew up in Hubli.

In her early years, Rama Rau lived in an India under British rule. When aged 5 and a half, with her 8-year-old sister Premila, she briefly attended an Anglo-Indian School where the teacher anglicized their names. Santha's name was changed to Cynthia and her sister's was changed to Pamela. The environment there they found to be condescending, as their teacher told them that "Indians cheat". They walked home, and never returned to that school. The incident was recounted in Rama Rau's short memoir entitled "By Any Other Name".

== Career ==
When India won its independence in 1947, Rama Rau's father was appointed as his nation's first ambassador to Japan. While in Tokyo, Japan, she met her future husband, an American, Faubion Bowers. After extensive traveling through Asia and a bit of Africa and Europe, the couple settled in New York City, New York. Rama Rau became an instructor in the English language faculty of Sarah Lawrence College, Bronxville, New York, in 1971, also working as a freelance writer.

She adapted the novel A Passage to India, with author E. M. Forster’s approval, for the theater. The play of the same name was produced for the Oxford Playhouse, Oxford, United Kingdom, moved to the West End in London, United Kingdom, in 1960 for 261 performances, and then on to Broadway in New York City where it was staged 109 times. It was adapted by John Maynard and directed by Waris Hussein for BBC television's Play of the Month in 1965. Although the film rights originally required Rama Rau to write the screenplay, director David Lean found her draft unsatisfactory and was able to reject it, although she is still credited in the titles because he still used some of her dialogue.

Rama Rau is the author of Home to India, East of Home, This is India, Remember the House (a novel), My Russian Journey, Gifts of Passage, The Adventuress, (a novel), View to the Southeast, and An Inheritance, as well as co-author (with Gayatri Devi) of A Princess Remembers: the memoirs of the Maharani of Jaipur.

== Personal life ==
She married Faubion Bowers in 1951 and had one son, Jai Peter Bowers in 1952. The couple divorced in 1966. In 1970, Rama Rau married Gurdon B. Wattles, and had no children. Faubion Bowers died in November 1999.

== Bibliography ==
Mukherjee, Durba and Sayan Chattopadhyay. "Passage through India: self-fashioning in Santha Rama Rau's Indian Travel Writings." Studies in Travel Writings 24 (4), 366 - 384: 2020. <https://doi.org/10.1080/13645145.2021.1946735>
