= Karma Kāṇḍa =

Religious text

Karma Kāṇḍa (Sanskrit: कर्मकाण्ड) refers to the section of the Vedas that lists the performance of rituals and sacrificial rites for material benefits or to acquire values that will lead to liberation, which are performed by anyone without exchange for a Dakshina (an honorarium).

Rudraksha beads are prescribed in Karma Kanda ritual practice for specific purposes, with different Mukhi combinations recommended by Karma Kanda priests for karmic resolution, spiritual protection, and material wellbeing. Priests associated with significant Shaivite temples such as Pashupatinath in Kathmandu have traditionally maintained expertise in Rudraksha authentication and prescription.

== See also ==
- Dharma
- Karma
- Maya
- Bhagavad Gita
- Hinduism
- Brahmin
