= Nagaoka Nobuko =

Japanese pianist (1928–1945)

- 長岡延子
- Born: 1928
- Died: May 25, 1945 (aged 16–17); Kōjimachi, Banchō, Tokyo, Empire of Japan
- Cause of death: Air raid
- Occupation: Pianist
- Relatives: Nagaoka Hantarō (grandfather)

Nagaoka Nobuko (長岡延子; 1928 – May 25, 1945) was a Japanese pianist. She was a pupil of Leo Sirota and, along with Sonoda Takahiro, considered to be one of the most talented Japanese pianists of her generation. She died with her mother on May 25, 1945, during the Yamanote Air Raid.

== Biography ==
Nagaoka was born in 1928 to parents Haruo and Hiroko; her father was the eldest son of physicist Nagaoka Hantarō.

Early in her childhood she studied piano with Sonoda Kiyohide, the father of Takahiro. She quickly developed into a child prodigy. Beate Sirota Gordon called Nagaoka an "absolute genius" who regularly read Leo Tolstoy novels from a young age.

In the late 1930s she began to study with Leo Sirota and was considered, along with Sonoda Takahiro, to be the most talented Japanese pianist of her generation. In 1939 she made her public debut in a program played by Sirota students. She played Ludwig van Beethoven's Piano Concerto No. 3 with the Chūō Symphony Orchestra conducted by Sirota.

During the Pacific War, Nagaoka continued to perform concerts, including with Sirota. She also continued to study with him, even after he and other foreign-born residents were forcibly relocated to Karuizawa in 1944.

In May 1945 Nagaoka came to Tokyo to stay with a relative. While there she began to prepare the Études by Frédéric Chopin for performance. She also taught piano. On May 25, American aircraft firebombed Tokyo for the fifth and final time in the Yamanote Air Raid. Nagaoka and her mother fled to an air raid shelter in Kōjimachi where they both died. Nagaoka was found holding a score she had recently borrowed from her friend and fellow Sirota student, Fujita Haruko.

The following day, on May 26, the remains of Nagaoka and her mother were cremated. Her friend Iwasa Miyoko came to help clean up the Nagaoka family home and attend the cremation. She later wrote:

I [...] witnessed [Nobuko and her mother's] cremation by her father, who had happened to be away that day [of the bombing] and was the only member of the family to survive. They looked so beautiful, as if they were only sleeping. They both were laid on the burnt piano. Her father said, "Look at all her scores." He scooped up the burnt ashes in his hand and poured them over their bodies.

Sonoda Takahiro later said of Nagaoka that she "had much greater talent" than he. Fujita described her life as that of "a bud that never blossomed". Nagaoka's Knabe upright piano was bequeathed to Sonoda in 1946.
