= Koichi Kishi =

Koichi Kishi may refer to:

- Koichi Kishi (politician) (1940–2017), Japanese politician of the Liberal Democratic Party
- Kishi Kōichi (1909–1937), Japanese composer, conductor and violinist
