= Hantaro Nagaoka =

Japanese physicist (1865–1950)

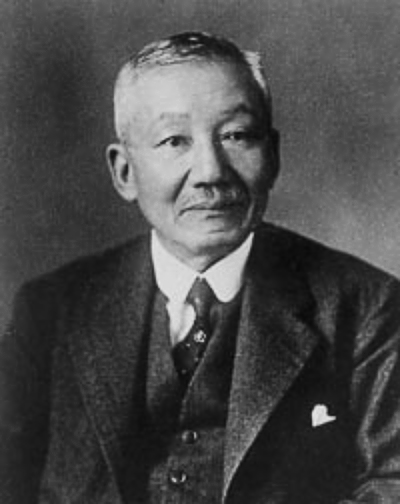
- Born: August 19, 1865; Ōmura, Nagasaki, Japan
- Died: December 11, 1950 (aged 85); Tokyo, Japan
- Relatives: Nagaoka Nobuko (granddaughter)
- Scientific career
- Fields: Physics
- Notable students: Kotaro Honda; Hideki Yukawa; Suekichi Kinoshita

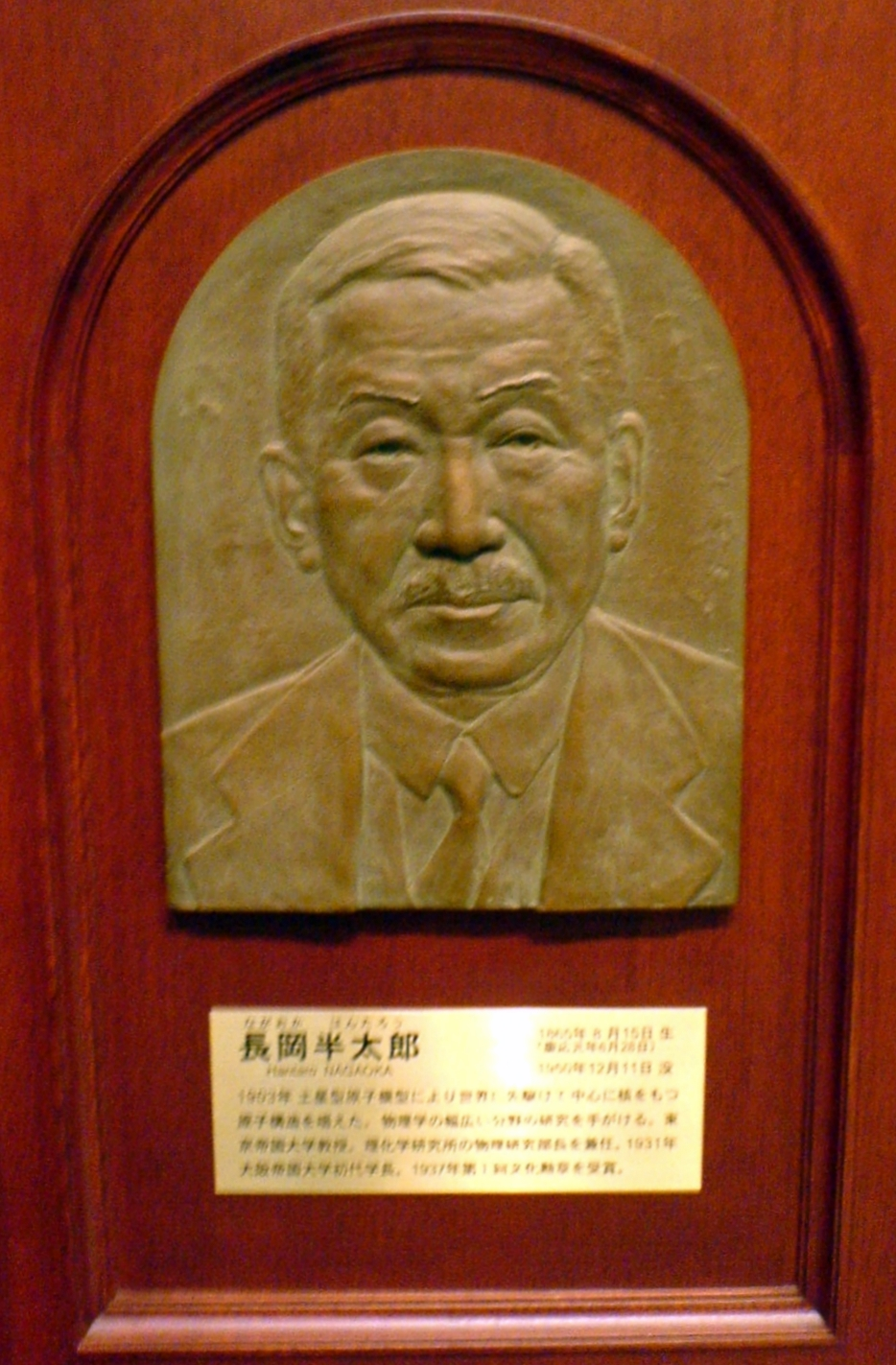
Relief of Nagaoka in Science Museum in Tokyo

Hantaro Nagaoka (長岡 半太郎, Nagaoka Hantarō; August 19, 1865 – December 11, 1950) was a Japanese physicist and a pioneer of Japanese physics during the Meiji period.

== Life ==
Nagaoka was born in Nagasaki, Japan on August 19, 1865 and educated at the University of Tokyo. After graduating with a degree in physics in 1887, Nagaoka worked with a visiting Scottish physicist, Cargill Gilston Knott, on early problems in magnetism, namely magnetostriction in liquid nickel. In 1893, Nagaoka traveled to Europe, where he continued his education at the universities of Berlin, Munich, and Vienna, including courses on Saturn's rings and a course with Ludwig Boltzmann on his Kinetic Theory of Gases, two influences which would be reflected in Nagaoka's later work. Nagaoka also attended, in 1900, the first International Congress of Physics in Paris, where he heard Marie Curie lecture on radioactivity, an event that aroused Nagaoka's interest in atomic physics. Nagaoka returned to Japan in 1901 and served as professor of physics at Tokyo University until 1925. After his retirement from Tokyo University, Nagaoka was appointed a head scientist at RIKEN, and also served as the first president of Osaka University, from 1931 to 1934.

His granddaughter was pianist Nagaoka Nobuko.

== Saturnian model of the atom ==
By 1900 physicists had begun to consider new models for the structure of the atom. The recent discovery by J. J. Thomson of the negatively charged electron implied that a neutral atom must also contain an opposite positive charge. In 1904, Thomson suggested that the atom was a sphere of uniform positive electrification, with electrons scattered through it like plums in a pudding, giving rise to the term plum pudding model.

Nagaoka rejected Thomson's model on the grounds that opposite charges are impenetrable. In 1904, Nagaoka proposed an alternative planetary model of the atom in which a positively charged center is surrounded by a number of revolving electrons, in the manner of Saturn and its rings.

Nagaoka's model featured:

- a very massive atomic center (in analogy to a very massive planet)
- thousands of electrons revolving around the nucleus, bound by electrostatic forces (in analogy to the rings revolving around Saturn, bound by gravitational forces).

For his model to be stable, Nagaoka showed that the central charge had to be 10,000 times the charge on the electron.

Based on his model, Nagaoka suggested that radioactive beta decay resulted from instability in the electron orbits. However this explanation did not account for important aspects of radioactivity such as its random nature and the high energy of alpha particle emission. He also suggested that the model would explain atomic spectra and chemical properties.

Ernest Rutherford mentions Nagaoka's model in his 1911 paper in which the atomic nucleus is proposed. However Nagaoka's work probably did not influence Rutherford's proposal.

Nagaoka's model was widely discussed by prominent scientists of the day, but a detailed study by George Schott showed the model could not correctly predict atomic spectra. Nagaoka himself abandoned his proposed model in 1908. Rutherford and Niels Bohr would present the more viable Bohr model in 1913.

== Other works ==
Nagaoka later did research in spectroscopy and other fields. In 1909, he published a paper on the inductance of solenoids. In 1924, he achieved the first successful synthesis of gold, produced from mercury by neutron bombardment. In 1929, Nagaoka became the first person to describe meteor burst communications.

Nagoka also did early research on earthquakes, from the 1900s to the 1920s, building upon works published Europe; "One used the principle of elasticity studies against the background of the current that succeeded in France in the first half of the 19th century. The other defined potential functions and explained phenomena from continuous equations of the nature of waves against the background of new currents that emerged in Britain or Germany from the mid-19th century onwards."

== Awards and recognition ==
- For his lifetime of scientific work, Nagaoka was granted the Order of Culture by the Japanese government in 1937.
- The Nagaoka crater on the Moon is named after him.
