= Kishi Kōichi =

Japanese composer and conductor (1909–1937)

Kishi Kōichi (貴志 康一; March 31, 1909 – November 17, 1937) was a Japanese composer, conductor and violinist.

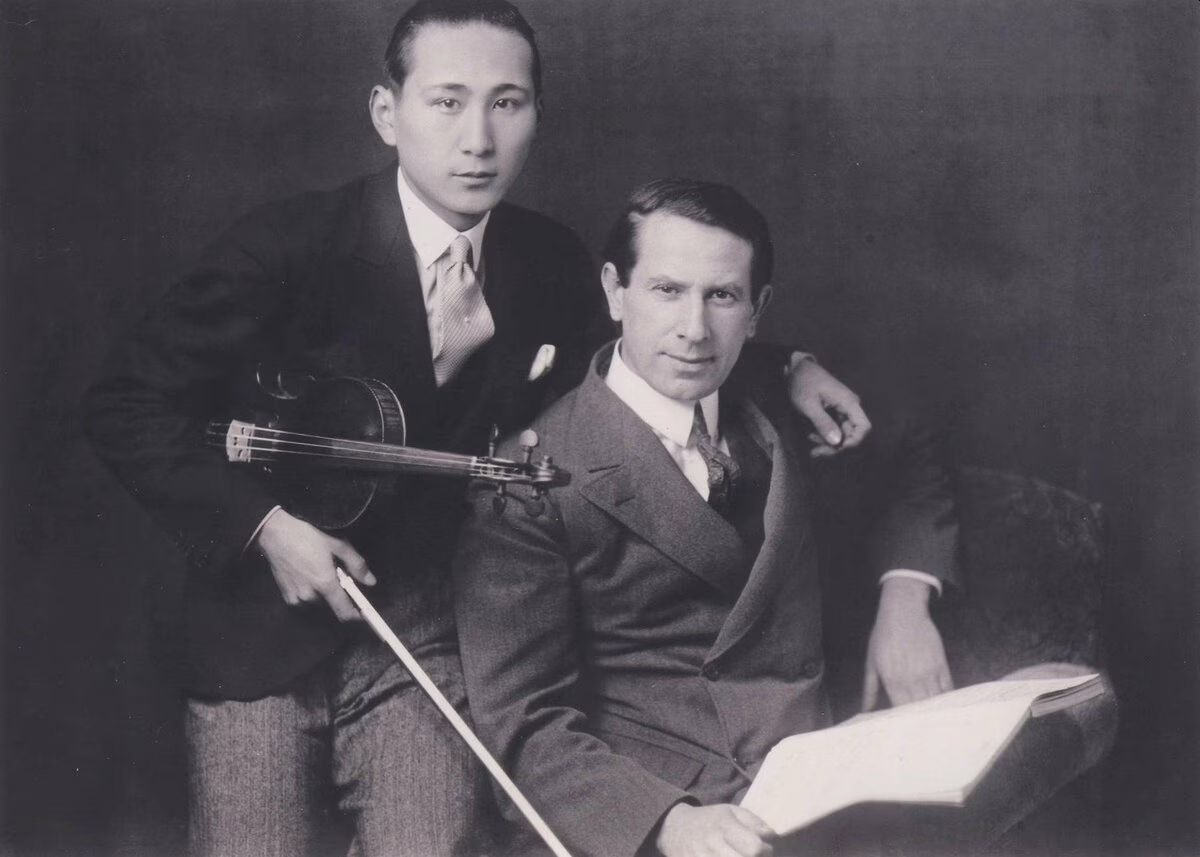
Kishi with Leo Sirota (right)

Kishi spent his childhood in Miyakojima, a district of Osaka. Following the example of his mother, he learned to play the violin. At the age of 18 he went to Europe to complete his training as a violinist at the Geneva Conservatory and the Berlin School of Music. He then studied composition with Paul Hindemith and conducting with Wilhelm Furtwängler. In 1934, at the age of 25, he conducted the Berlin Philharmonic. As a composer, Kishi's composition includes orchestral works, stage works, chamber works, film scores and songs. In 1935, he went back to Japan.

In 1937, the 28-year-old Kishi Kōichi died of a heart condition in Japan.

== Works ==
- Symphony Buddha
- Japanese sketches for large orchestra
- Japanese Suite for large orchestra
- Violin Concerto
- Ballet Ama no iwato (2 acts)
- Operetta Namiko (3 acts)
- Violin Sonata in D minor
