= Takahiro Sonoda =

Japanese pianist (1928–2004)

- 園田高弘
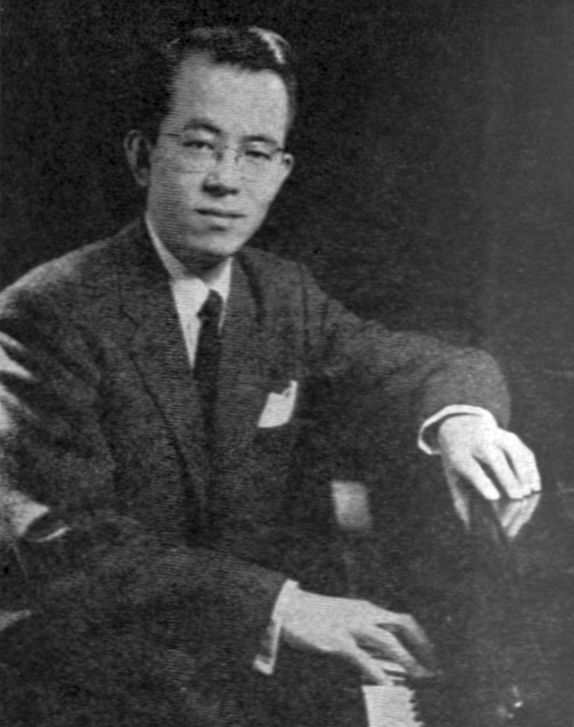
- Sonoda c. 1956
- Born: September 17, 1928; Nogata, Empire of Japan
- Died: October 7, 2004 (aged 76); Meguro City, Tokyo, Japan
- Occupation: Classical pianist
- Website: www.takahiro-sonoda.com/index.html

Takahiro Sonoda (Japanese: 園田 高弘, Hepburn: Sonoda Takahiro; September 17, 1928 – October 7, 2004) was a Japanese classical pianist.

== Life ==
Sonoda was born in 1928 in the town of Nogata, today a part of Tokyo and renamed Nakano City. He was first taught piano by his father, Kiyohide, a student of Robert Casadesus. After his father's death in 1936, Sonoda continued his lessons; three years later he came under the tutelage of Leo Sirota, then resident in Japan. After graduating from elementary school, he entered the Tokyo Academy of Music (later absorbed by the Tokyo University of the Arts).

After the Pacific War, Sonoda began his career as a performer. He traveled to Europe in 1952 in the hopes of participating in the Geneva International Music Competition, but failed to place. Through an introduction by Kiyoko Tanaka, he met Marguerite Long, who briefly coached him privately. In Berlin he was also coached by Helmut Roloff (an encounter the Japanese government cited in awarding Roloff the Order of the Sacred Treasure for contributions to Japanese music in 1990).

In 1955 Sonoda returned to Japan and married a fellow international student. In 1954 Herbert von Karajan made his Japanese debut conducting the NHK Symphony Orchestra with Sonoda as soloist. Impressed by the young man's playing, Karajan persuaded Sonoda to study in Germany and wrote him a letter of recommendation. After his studies there, Sonoda debuted with the Berlin Philharmonic Orchestra in 1959. The following year he returned to Japan, becoming a professor at the Kyoto City University of Arts. In his later years he became part of the faculty at the Shōwa Academia Musicae.

Although admired for his performances of works by German classics such as Bach, Beethoven, and Brahms, Sonoda maintained a keen interest in modern music. He was a member of the Shūzō Takiguchi-led Experimental Studio, along with friends Tōru Takemitsu and Toshirō Mayuzumi. In 1971 he premiered Makoto Moroi's Piano Concerto No. 1 with the Berlin Philharmonic Orchestra.

When the Shōwa Emperor died on January 7, 1989, NHK General TV followed their announcement of his passing by broadcasting Sonoda's recording of Chopin's Funeral March. He was awarded the title of Person of Cultural Merit by the Japanese government in 1998.

He died in 2004 from an aortic aneurysm while preparing for a forthcoming concert.
