= Fujita Haruko =

Japanese musician and jurist (1918–2001)

- 藤田晴子
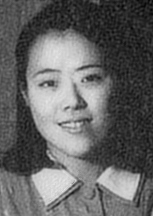
- Fujita, c. late 1930s
- Born: February 25, 1918; Tokyo, Empire of Japan
- Died: October 10, 2001 (aged 83)
- Education: University of Tokyo
- Occupations: Pianist; music critic; jurist
- Awards: Order of the Sacred Treasure

Fujita Haruko (藤田晴子; February 25, 1918 – October 10, 2001) was a Japanese pianist, teacher, music critic, and jurist. Born to a family of jurists, she became one of the leading Japanese pianists of the 1930s. After the Pacific War she turned from music to jurisprudence, becoming one of the first female students enrolled at University of Tokyo. In later life she primarily worked as an academic, music critic, and constitutional scholar.

== Biography ==
Fujita was born in Tokyo in 1918; her father was an international lawyer. In 1923 she and her family moved to Leipzig, Germany, where she became fluent in German. Later in life she also became fluent in English, French, and Italian.

In 1930 Fujita began to study piano with Leo Sirota, who had immigrated to Japan with his family in 1929. In 1931 her father became ill, which strained her family's finances. Sirota pledged to support the development of her talents and taught her free of charge. Later when Fujita was preparing for her public debut recital, Sirota's wife showed her support by gifting her a concert gown. Fujita's father died in May 1945.

During the 1930s Fujita ascended into the forefront of Japanese pianists. In 1936 Fujita was the runner-up in the piano division of the Fifth Japan Music Competition. The 1937 contest was canceled because of the outbreak of the Second Sino-Japanese War, but she shared the top prize with Tanaka Sonoko when it resumed in 1938. In 1941 her Nippon Victor recording of the Japanese Fantasia for piano and orchestra by Yamamoto Naotada was awarded the Ministry of Education Prize. She was also the member of a piano trio with violinist Suzuki Shinichi and his cellist brother Fumio, which they founded in 1937.

After the start of the Pacific War, Fujita became a frequent soloist in concerts with the Tokyo Symphony Orchestra. When her teacher Sirota was banned from public performance because of his Jewish heritage, Fujita was abruptly asked to deputize for him in a performance of Ludwig van Beethoven's Piano Concerto No. 5 in Yokohama. When Sirota and his wife were forcibly relocated to Karuizawa in 1944, Fujita kept her former teacher supplied with food rations. After the war in 1946 Fujita unsuccessfully campaigned for Sirota to remain in Japan.

Changing styles of piano performance disillusioned Fujita. She enrolled at the Faculty of Law at the University of Tokyo, becoming one of the institution's first 19 female students. After graduating in 1949 she worked as a research assistant at the University of Tokyo, then as a librarian at the National Diet Library; she was promoted to director of the Political Administration Bureau in 1966. After retiring from her post at the National Diet Library, Fujita joined the faculty of Yachiyo International University. She was also a respected constitutional scholar and music critic.

Fujita was awarded the Order of the Sacred Treasure, 3rd class, in 1988. She died on October 20, 2001.

== Legacy ==
In 2009 the Fujita Haruko Memorial Museum was opened in Hachimantai, Iwate.
