= Beate Sirota Gordon =

Austrian and American activist (1923–2012)

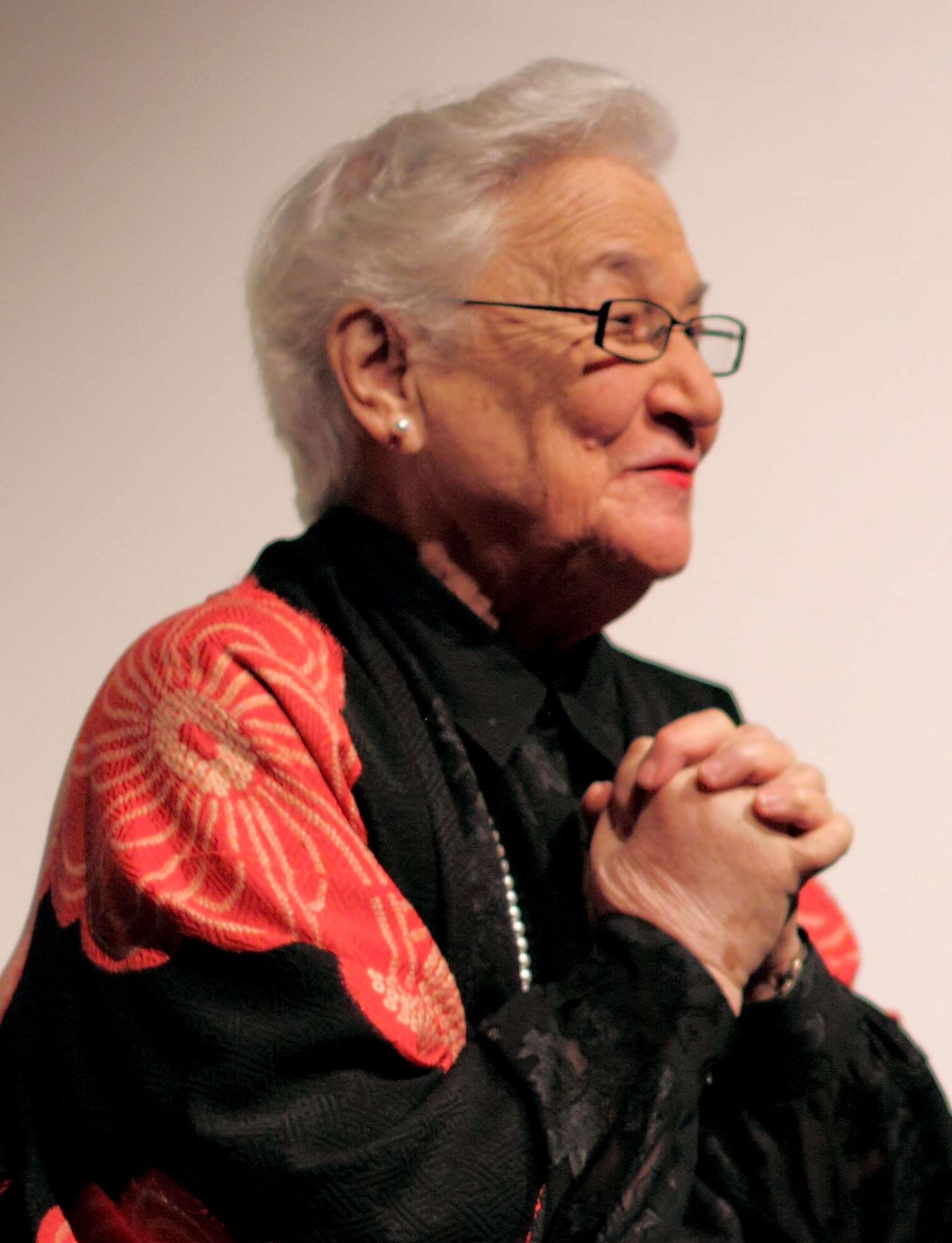
- Gordon at the Japan Society in 2011
- Born: Beate Sirota; October 25, 1923; Vienna, Austria
- Died: December 30, 2012 (aged 89); Manhattan, New York City, U.S.
- Citizenship: United States
- Education: Mills College
- Occupation: Performing arts presenter
- Years active: 1943–2012
- Organizations: Japan Society; Asia Society
- Spouse: Joseph Gordon (m. 1948; died 2012)
- Children: 2
- Parents: Augustine Horenstein Sirota; Leo Sirota
- Relatives: Jascha Horenstein (uncle)
- Awards: American Dance Guild Award (1978); Dance on Camera Festival Awards (1984, 1985); Obie Award (1985); Bessie Award (1990); Honorary Doctor of Fine Arts Mills College (1991); President's Medal CCNY (1992); Avon Grand Award to Women's Award (1997); John D. Rockefeller Award Asian Cultural Council (1997); Order of the Sacred Treasure Gold Rays with Rosette (1998); Ryoko Akamatsu Award (2005); Honorary Doctor of Law Smith College (2008); Honorary Ph.D. Mills College (2011)

Beate Sirota Gordon (/beɪˈɑːteɪ/; October 25, 1923 – December 30, 2012) was an Austrian and American performing arts presenter and women's rights advocate. Born in Vienna, Austria, she moved to the Empire of Japan in 1929 with her father, the pianist Leo Sirota. After graduating from the American School in Japan, she moved to Oakland, California, where she enrolled at Mills College. Being one of the few people not of Japanese descent who was fluent in Japanese, she obtained work at the Office of War Information in the Foreign Broadcast Information Service of the Federal Communications Commission.

Sirota Gordon returned to Japan after the end of the war, assigned as translator to Douglas MacArthur, Supreme Commander for the Allied Powers. She later was recruited to be one of the writers of Japan's postwar constitution, where she played an integral role in its mandating of equality between the sexes.

Following Sirota Gordon's return to the United States in 1948, she married and eventually became the performing arts director of the Japan Society and the Asia Society. In this role, she fomented interest in Japanese art and artists in the United States. She retired in 1991.

== Early life, family and education ==
Born in Vienna on October 25, 1923, Beate Sirota was the only child of the pianist Leo and Augustine Sirota (née Horenstein), Russians of Jewish descent. Leo had emigrated from Russia because of the country's anti-Semitic violence and settled in Austria-Hungary. Beate's maternal uncle was the conductor Jascha Horenstein.

Sirota's family emigrated to Japan in 1929, when Leo Sirota accepted an invitation to become a professor at the Imperial Academy of Music (which became Tokyo University of the Arts). Her childhood education was in Tokyo: first at the German School of Tokyo for six years until age twelve, and then at the American School in Japan because her parents determined the German School was "too Nazi".

In 1939, Beate Sirota left Tokyo for Oakland, California, US, to attend Mills College. She was inducted into Phi Beta Kappa society and graduated in 1943 with a bachelor's degree in modern languages. She became a naturalized U.S. citizen in January 1945.

== World War II and Japan ==
During World War II, Sirota was completely cut off from her parents in Japan. She later said that in the U.S. in 1940, she was one of only sixty-five Caucasians who were fluent in Japanese. During the war, she worked for the Office of War Information in the Foreign Broadcast Information Service of the Federal Communications Commission. She also worked for Time magazine.

As soon as the war ended, Sirota went to Japan in search of her parents, who survived the war as internees in Karuizawa, Nagano. On Christmas Eve, 1945, she was the first civilian woman to arrive in post-war Japan. Assigned to the Political Affairs staff, she worked for Supreme Commander for the Allied Powers (SCAP) Douglas MacArthur's occupation army as a translator. In addition to Japanese, she was fluent in English, German, French, and Russian.

When the U.S. began drafting a new constitution for Japan in February 1946, Sirota was enlisted to help and was assigned to the subcommittee dedicated to writing the section of the constitution devoted to civil rights. She was one of only two women in the larger group, the other being economist Eleanor Hadley. Sirota played an integral role, drafting the language regarding legal equality between men and women in Japan, including Articles 14 and 24 on Equal Rights and Women's Civil Rights. Article 14 states, in part: "All of the people are equal under the law and there shall be no discrimination in political, economic or social relations because of race, creed, sex, social status or family origin". Article 24 includes:

Marriage shall be based only on the mutual consent of both sexes and it shall be maintained through mutual cooperation with the equal rights of husband and wife as a basis. 2) With regard to choice of spouse, property rights, inheritance, choice of domicile, divorce and other matters pertaining to marriage and the family, laws shall be enacted from the standpoint of individual dignity and the essential equality of the sexes.

These additions to the constitution were vital to women's rights in Japan. "Japanese women were historically treated like chattel; they were property to be bought and sold on a whim," Gordon said in 1999.

Sirota, as interpreter on MacArthur's staff, was the only woman present during the negotiations between the Japanese Steering Committee and the American team.

In 1947, Sirota was a target of Major General Charles A. Willoughby's year-long investigation of leftist infiltration, in which he tried to construct a case against Sirota, charging her with advancing the communist cause within the new government of Japan.

== Performing arts ==
After returning to the US with her parents in 1948, Beate Sirota married Lieutenant Joseph Gordon, who had been chief of the interpreter–translator team for the military intelligence section at the Allied Supreme Commander GHQ and was also present for the negotiations on the constitution. Settling in New York in 1947, she took a number of jobs, including one at Time magazine. Gordon eventually returned to her primary interest, the performing arts. She had studied ballet, modern, ethnic, and folk dance, as well as piano and drama in Tokyo and at Mills.

While raising her two young children, she joined the reactivated Japan Society in New York City in 1954 as Director of Student Programs, providing career and job counseling to Japanese students in New York. One of the students was Yoko Ono, with whom she maintained a lifelong friendship. She also worked with visual artists, arranging exhibits and lecture-demonstrations, including the first American visit of the renowned woodblock artist, Shikō Munakata. In 1958 she was appointed the Society's Director of Performing Arts. In this capacity she introduced a number of Japanese performing artists to the New York public, helping to develop many careers. Among these artists were Toshi Ichiyanagi, now one of Japan's foremost composers and Suzushi Hanayagi, whom she introduced to the theater director Robert Wilson, with whom Hanayagi collaborated on the Knee Plays, and other works. In addition, in 1960, Gordon became a consultant to the Asia Society performing arts program, expanding her activities from Japan to the other countries of Asia.

Gordon served as a consultant and adviser to producers such as Harold Prince for his production of the Stephen Sondheim musical, Pacific Overtures. In the early 1960s, she was influential in bringing koto music to the attention of Americans by introducing composer Henry Cowell to the great Japanese koto player, Kimio Eto. Cowell subsequently wrote a concerto for koto and orchestra for Eto which was presented by Leopold Stokowski and the Philadelphia Orchestra in New York, Philadelphia, and on tour. Gordon also produced the first Asian performances at the Lincoln Center for the Performing Arts.

Gordon's travels in search of authentic performing arts from Asia took her to such remote areas as Purulia in West Bengal, India, and Kuching in Sarawak, Malaysia, where she sought out indigenous performing artists to bring to universities, museums, and other cultural venues in New York and across the US and Canada.

Over the years, Gordon produced 39 tours by 34 companies from 16 countries. An estimated 1.5 million Americans in 400 cities and towns in 42 states observed these performances, which brought new ways of experiencing Asian performing arts to audiences throughout the country. They also intensified the post-World War II Asian influence on American art, design, music, literature, and theater.

For the media, Gordon produced and hosted a series of 12 half-hour programs on the Japanese arts broadcast on New York's Channel 13 and served as commentator for a series of four hour-long programs featuring traditional and popular music from Japan, China, India, and Thailand which were broadcast on Channel 31, New York City's municipal television station. She also produced 29 video tapes and five films televised nationally. For the Nonesuch Records Explorer Series, she produced eight albums of Asian music. Gordon served on the panel of, and was subsequently a consultant for, the Dance Program of the National Endowment for the Arts. She was also the Associate Editor in charge of the Asian Dance section of the International Encyclopedia of Dance published by Oxford University Press in February, 1998.

== Honors, retirement and legacy ==
For her work as an arts presenter, and for associated activities such as production of video tapes, records, and scholarly monographs on various Asian art forms, Gordon received numerous awards, among them the American Dance Guild Award (1978), two Dance on Camera Festival Awards (1984, 1985), an Obie Award for the introduction of Samul Nori to the United States (1985); a Bessie Award (1990) which cited her "for beating an ever-widening path between the cultures of East and West and for understanding the essential creative dialectic between tradition and experimentation and the fundamental partnership of artists involved in both"; the 2005 Ryoko Akamatsu Award, the Avon Grand Award to Women's Award (1997), and the John D. Rockefeller Award from the Asian Cultural Council (1997) which gave "recognition of your extraordinary contributions in introducing American scholars, artists, and general audiences to the performing arts of Asia and in increasing the American understanding and appreciation of Asian dance, theater, and music traditions."

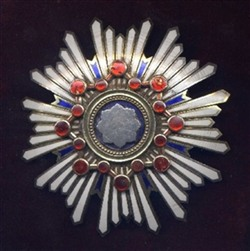
Order of the Sacred Treasure

Gordon retired from the directorship at the Asia Society in 1991, continuing as Senior Consultant for Performing Arts until July 1993. She received an Honorary Doctor of Fine Arts degree from Mills College in 1991, and the President's Medal from the College of the City of New York in 1992. In November 1998 she received the Order of the Sacred Treasure, Gold Rays with Rosette, from the Japanese government. She also received an honorary Doctor of Law degree from Smith College in 2008, and was awarded an honorary Ph.D. from Mills College in 2011, where a collection of her papers now resides.

The Japanese television network, Asahi Broadcasting Corporation (ABC), produced a 90-minute documentary on Gordon's life, first broadcast in Japan on May 22, 1993. A Japanese-language biography, Christmas 1945: The Biography of the Woman Who Wrote the Equal Rights Clause of the Japanese Constitution, was published on October 20, 1995. The English version of this book was published in March 1998 under the title The Only Woman in the Room: A Memoir. A play based on Gordon's role in writing the Japanese constitution, A String of Pearls by James Miki, was performed by the Seinen Gekijo in Tokyo, in April 1998. Gordon also lectured extensively in the United States and in Japan on her role in writing the Japanese constitution.

The film The Sirota Family and the 20th Century, produced by Tomoko Fujiwara, made its debut in the West in Paris in April 2009. It is the story of Gordon's father's family and their flight from Europe into the diaspora.

The asteroid 5559 Beategordon, discovered by Eleanor Helin, is named in her honor. The official naming citation was published by the Minor Planet Center on November 8, 2019 (M.P.C. 117229).

Jeff Gottesfeld published a 2020 book for children, celebrating Gordon's activism and documenting the historical struggle for equal rights.

== Death ==
Gordon died of pancreatic cancer at her home in Manhattan, New York City on December 30, 2012, at the age of 89. Her last public statement was to urge that the peace and women's rights clauses of the Japanese Constitution be preserved. Her husband, Joseph Gordon, had died four months earlier, on August 29, 2012, at the age of 93.

== Selected works ==
In a statistical overview derived from writings by and about Gordon, OCLC/WorldCat encompasses roughly 150+ works in 150+ publications in 4 languages and 1,000+ library holdings.

- Introduction to Asian Dance (1964)
- An Introduction to the Dance of India, China, Korea [and] Japan (1965)
- 1945年のクリスマス: 日本国憲法に「男女平等」を書いた女性の自伝 (1995)
- The Only Woman in the Room: A Memoir (1997)

Oral histories

- The Reminiscences of Faubion Bowers by Faubion Bowers (1960), with Beate Gordon
- The reminiscences of Cyrus H. Peake by Cyrus Peake (1961), with Beate Gordon
- The Reminiscences of Esther Crane by Esther Crane (1961), with Beate Gordon
- Occupation of Japan Project by Eugene Dooman (1970), with Beate Gordon
- The Japanese Reminiscences of Roger Baldwin by Roger Nash Baldwin (1974), with Beate Gordon
- The Reminiscences of Burton Crane by Burton Crane (1974), with Beate Gordon
- The Reminiscences of Douglas W. Overton by Douglas Overton (1974), with Beate Gordon
- The Reminiscences of Joseph Gordon by Joseph Gordon (1974), with Beate Gordon
- The Reminiscences of Harold G. Henderson by Harold Gould Henderson (1976), with Beate Gordon
- The Reminiscences of Dr. Lauren V. Ackerman by Lauren Ackerman (1976), with Beate Gordon
- The Reminiscences of John R. Harold by John R. Harold (1976), with Beate Gordon
