= 38th British Academy Film Awards =

1985 film awards ceremony

- Date: 5 March 1985
- Site: Grosvenor House Hotel
- Hosted by: Terry Wogan

Highlights
- Best Film: The Killing Fields
- Best Actor: Haing S. Ngor; The Killing Fields
- Best Actress: Maggie Smith; A Private Function
- Most awards: The Killing Fields (8)
- Most nominations: The Killing Fields (13)

he 38th British Academy Film Awards, more commonly known as the BAFTAs, took place on 5 March 1985 at the Grosvenor House Hotel in London, honouring the best national and foreign films of 1984. Presented by the British Academy of Film and Television Arts, accolades were handed out for the best feature-length film and documentaries of any nationality that were screened at British cinemas in 1984.

The evening's big winner was the British-made The Killing Fields, which had 13 nominations and won 8 of them.

== Winners and nominees ==
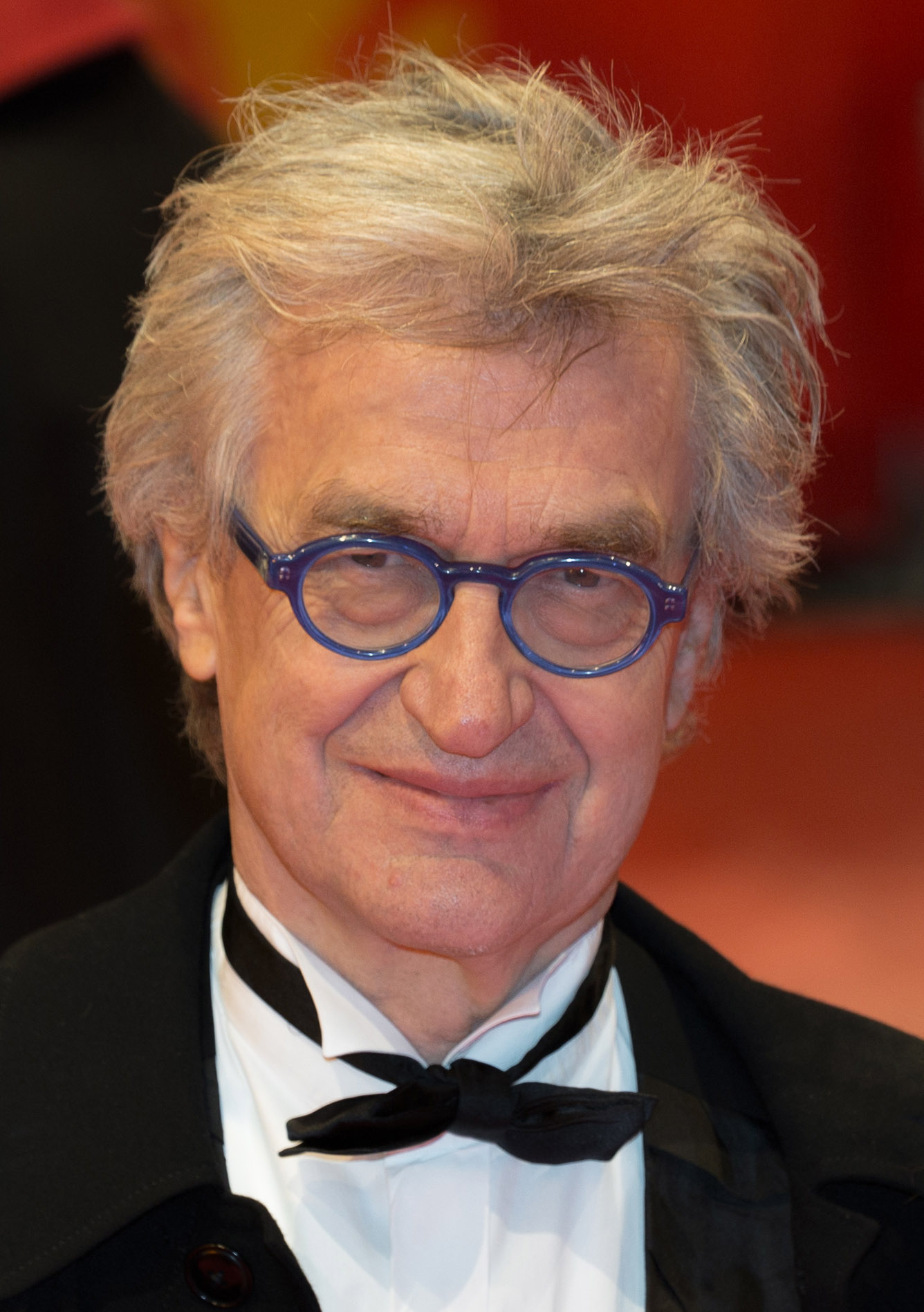
Wim Wenders, Best Director winner

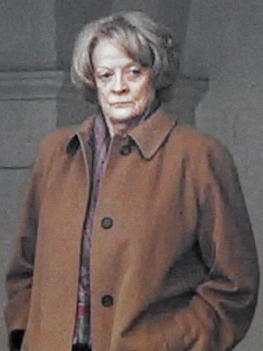
Maggie Smith, Best Actress winner

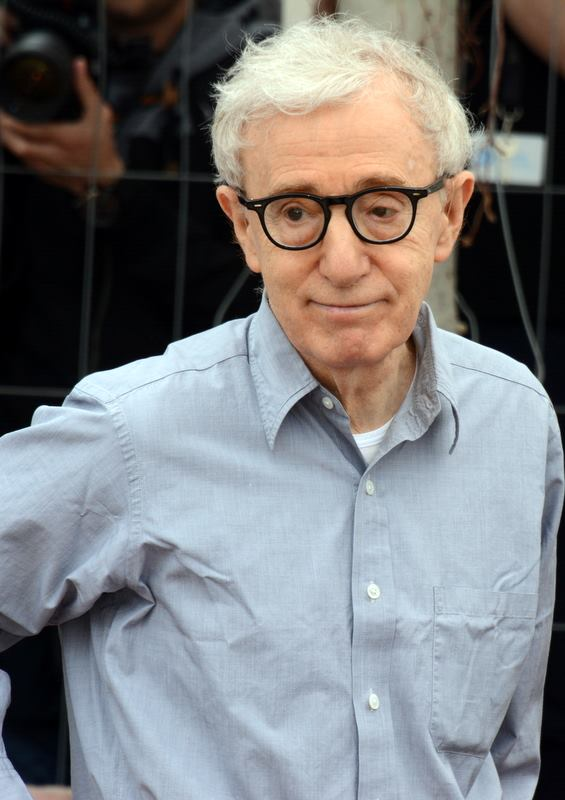
Woody Allen, Best Original Screenplay winner

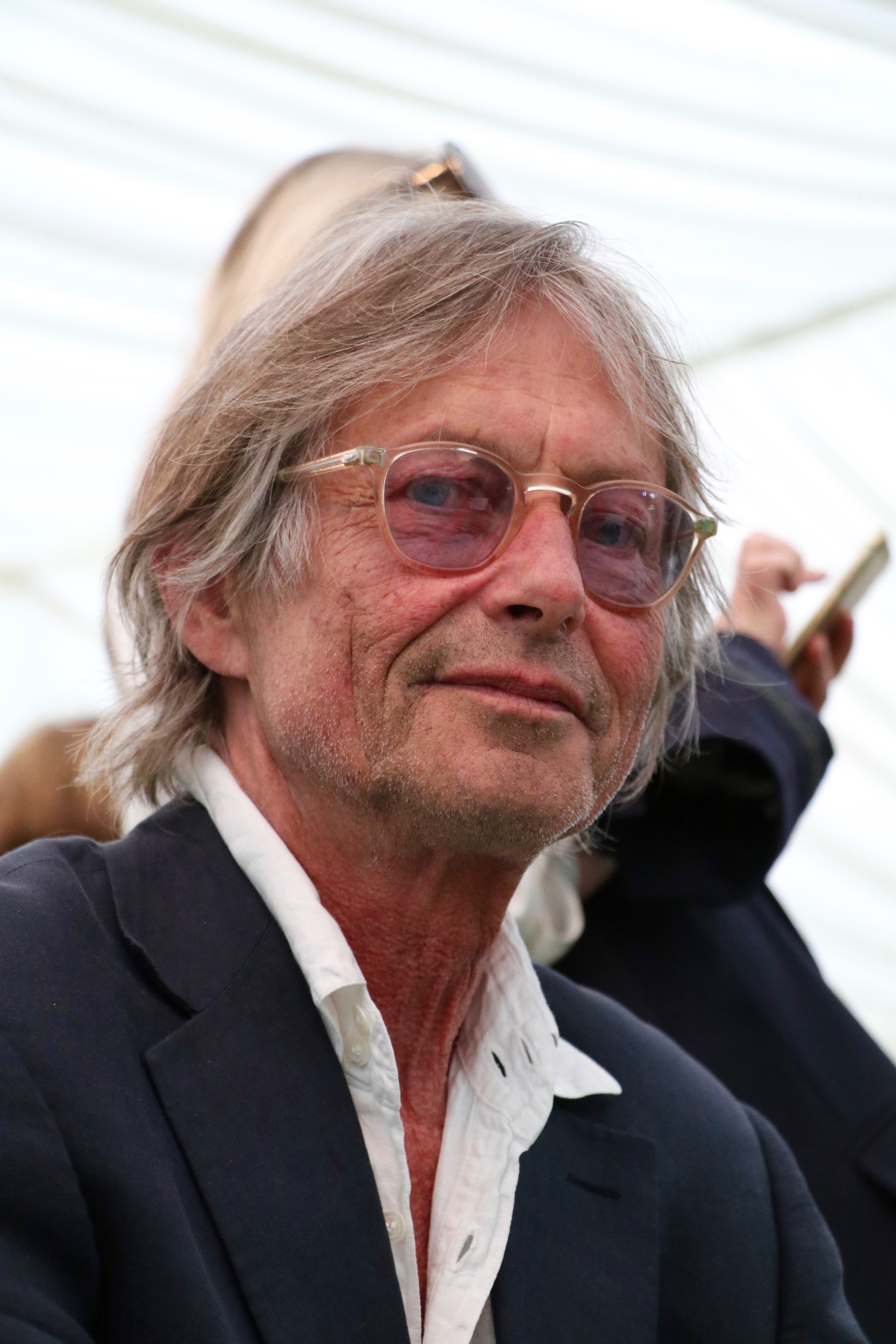
Bruce Robinson, Best Adapted Screenplay winner

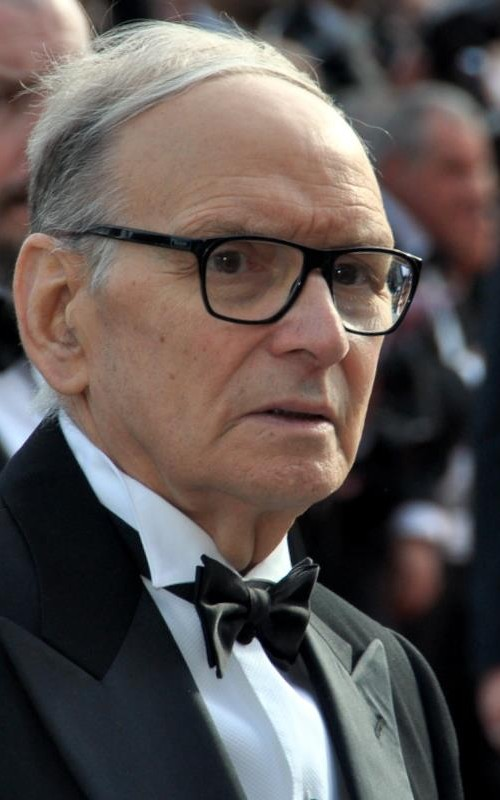
Ennio Morricone, Best Original Score winner

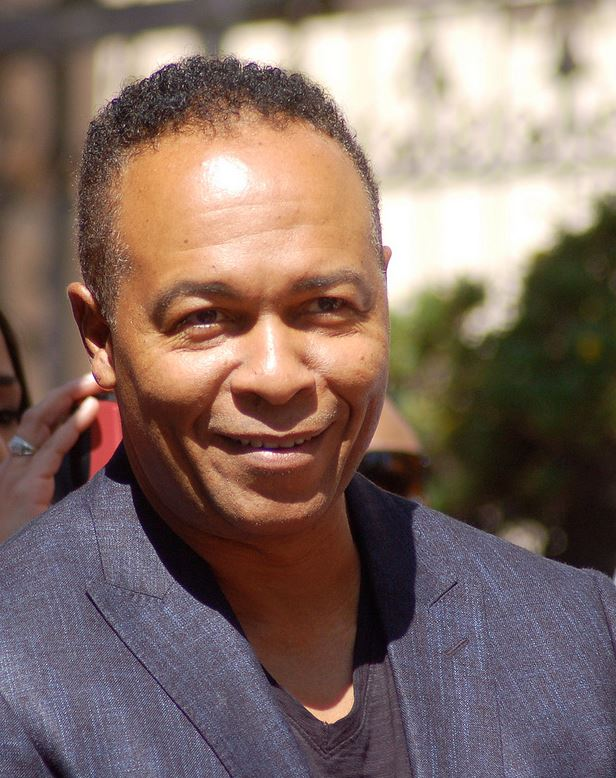
Ray Parker Jr., Best Original Song winner

=== Outstanding British Contribution to Cinema ===
- **Alan Parker** and **Alan Marshall**

=== Awards ===
Winners are listed first and highlighted in boldface.

**Best Film**: **The Killing Fields – David Puttnam**; The Dresser – Peter Yates; Paris, Texas – Chris Sievernich and Anatole Dauman; A Private Function – Mark Shivas	**Best Direction**: **Wim Wenders – Paris, Texas**; Peter Yates – The Dresser; Roland Joffé – The Killing Fields; Sergio Leone – Once Upon a Time in America
**Best Actor in a Leading Role**: **Haing S. Ngor – The Killing Fields as Dith Pran**; Albert Finney – The Dresser as Sir; Sam Waterston – The Killing Fields as Sydney Schanberg; Tom Courtenay – The Dresser as Norman	**Best Actress in a Leading Role**: **Maggie Smith – A Private Function as Joyce Chilvers**; Helen Mirren – Cal as Marcella; Meryl Streep – Silkwood as Karen Silkwood; Shirley MacLaine – Terms of Endearment as Aurora Greenway
**Best Actor in a Supporting Role**: **Denholm Elliott – A Private Function as Charles Swaby**; Ian Holm – Greystoke: The Legend of Tarzan, Lord of the Apes as Capitaine Phillippe d'Arnot; Michael Elphick – Gorky Park as Pasha; Ralph Richardson – Greystoke: The Legend of Tarzan, Lord of the Apes as The 6th Earl of Greystoke	**Best Actress in a Supporting Role**: **Liz Smith – A Private Function as Joyce's Mother**; Cher – Silkwood as Dusty Ellis; Eileen Atkins – The Dresser as Madge; Tuesday Weld – Once Upon a Time in America as Carol
**Best Original Screenplay**: **Broadway Danny Rose – Woody Allen**; The Big Chill – Lawrence Kasdan and Barbara Benedek; Comfort and Joy – Bill Forsyth; A Private Function – Alan Bennett	**Best Adapted Screenplay**: **The Killing Fields – Bruce Robinson**; Another Country – Julian Mitchell; The Dresser – Ronald Harwood; Paris, Texas – Sam Shepard
**Best Cinematography**: **The Killing Fields – Chris Menges**; Greystoke: The Legend of Tarzan, Lord of the Apes – John Alcott; Indiana Jones and the Temple of Doom – Douglas Slocombe; Once Upon a Time in America – Tonino Delli Colli	**Best Costume Design**: **Once Upon a Time in America – Gabriella Pescucci**; The Bostonians – Jenny Beavan and John Bright; The Company of Wolves – Elizabeth Wailer; Swann in Love – Yvonne Sassinot De Nesle
**Best Editing**: **The Killing Fields – Jim Clark**; Another Country – Gerry Hambling; Indiana Jones and the Temple of Doom – Michael Kahn; Under Fire – John Bloom and Mark Conte	**Best Makeup and Hair**: **Greystoke: The Legend of Tarzan, Lord of the Apes – Paul Engelen, Peter Frampton, Rick Baker and Joan Hills**; The Company of Wolves – Jane Royle and Christopher Tucker; The Dresser – Alan Boyle; The Killing Fields – Tommie Manderson
**Best Original Music**: **Once Upon a Time in America – Ennio Morricone**; Carmen – Paco de Lucía; The Killing Fields – Mike Oldfield; Paris, Texas – Ry Cooder	**Best Original Song**: **"Ghostbusters" (Ghostbusters) – Ray Parker Jr.**; "I Just Called to Say I Love You" (The Woman in Red) – Stevie Wonder; "No More Lonely Nights" (Give My Regards to Broad Street) – Paul McCartney; "Together in Electric Dreams" (Electric Dreams) – Giorgio Moroder and Philip Oakey
**Best Production Design**: **The Killing Fields – Roy Walker**; The Company of Wolves – Anton Furst; Greystoke: The Legend of Tarzan, Lord of the Apes – Stuart Craig; Nineteen Eighty-Four – Allan Cameron	**Best Sound**: **The Killing Fields – Ian Fuller, Clive Winter and Bill Rowe**; Carmen – Carlos Faruolo, Alfonso Marcos and Antonio Illan; Greystoke: The Legend of Tarzan, Lord of the Apes – Ivan Sharrock, Gordon McCallum, Les Wiggins and Roy Baker; Indiana Jones and the Temple of Doom – Ben Burtt, Simon Kaye and Laurel Ladevich
**Best Special Visual Effects**: **Indiana Jones and the Temple of Doom – Dennis Muren, George Gibbs, Michael J. McAlister and Lorne Peterson**; The Company of Wolves – Christopher Tucker and Alan Whibley; Ghostbusters – Richard Edlund; The Killing Fields – Fred Cramer	**Most Promising Newcomer to Leading Film Roles**: **Haing S. Ngor – The Killing Fields as Dith Pran**; John Lynch – Cal as Cal; Rupert Everett – Another Country as Guy Bennett; Tim Roth – The Hit as Myron
**Best Documentary**: **Up – Michael Apted**; Afghanistan Reports: Allah Against the Sunships – Sandy Gall; GI Brides – Lavinia Warner; South Bank Show: Allan Bennett – David Hinton	**Best Film Not in the English Language**: **Carmen – Emiliano Piedra and Carlos Saura**; The Return of Martin Guerre – Daniel Vigne; A Sunday in the Country – Alain Sarde and Bertrand Tavernier; Swann in Love – Margaret Menegoz and Volker Schlöndorff
**Best Short Animation**: **Rupert and the Frog Song – Geoff Dunbar**; Danger Mouse – Brian Cosgrove and Mark Hall; Thomas the Tank Engine and Friends – Britt Allcroft, David Mitton and Robert D. Cardona; The Wind in the Willows – Mark Hall and Brian Cosgrove	**Best Short Film**: **The Dress – Eva Sereny**; Killing Time – Chris O'Reilly; Samson and Delilah – Mark Peploe

== Statistics ==
Films that received multiple nominations
Nominations	Film
13	The Killing Fields
7	The Dresser
6	Greystoke: The Legend of Tarzan, Lord of the Apes
5	Once Upon a Time in America
5	A Private Function
4	The Company of Wolves
4	Indiana Jones and the Temple of Doom
4	Paris, Texas
3	Another Country
3	Carmen
2	Cal
2	Ghostbusters
2	Silkwood
2	Swann in Love

Films that received multiple awards
Awards	Film
8	The Killing Fields
3	A Private Function
2	Once Upon a Time in America

== See also ==
- 57th Academy Awards
- 10th César Awards
- 37th Directors Guild of America Awards
- 42nd Golden Globe Awards
- 5th Golden Raspberry Awards
- 11th Saturn Awards
- 37th Writers Guild of America Awards
