= List of awards and nominations received by Sam Waterston =

Sam Waterston awards and nominations
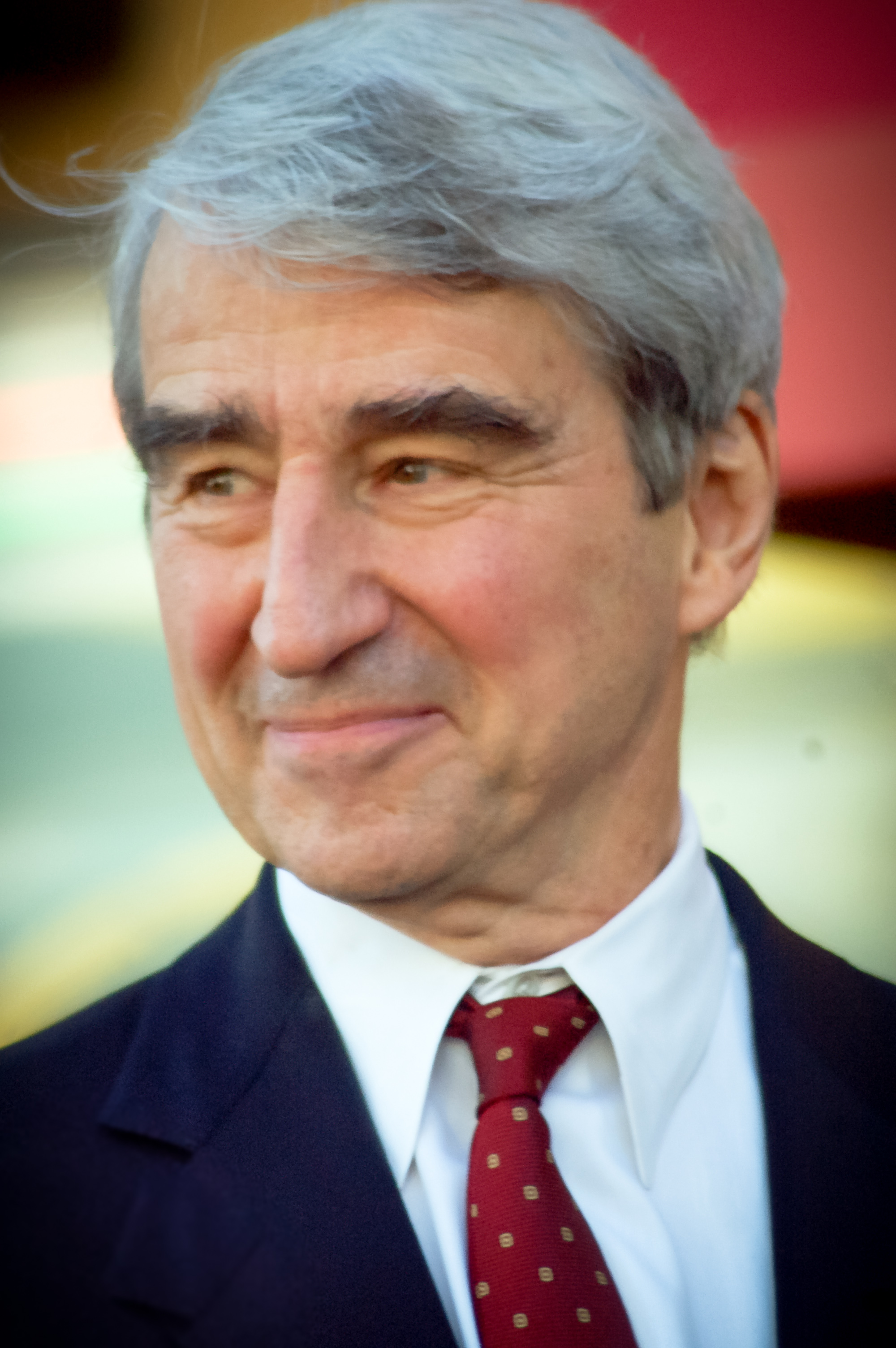
- Waterston
Awards and nominations
Award	Wins	Nominations
Academy Awards	0	1
BAFTA Awards	0	2
Emmy Awards	1	8
Golden Globes	1	7
SAG Awards	1	11
Tony Awards	0	1

Totals (Note: Certain award groups do not simply award one winner. They acknowledge several different recipients, have runners-up, and have third place. Since this is a specific recognition and is different from losing an award, runner-up mentions are considered wins in this award tally. For simplification and to avoid errors, each award in this list has been presumed to have had a prior nomination.)
- Wins: 3
- Nominations: 49

This article is a List of awards and nominations received by Sam Waterston

Sam Waterston is an American actor. He is known for his earnest and authoritative roles on stage and screen. Over his career he has received various accolades including a Primetime Emmy Award, a Golden Globe Award and a Screen Actors Guild Award as well as nominations for an Academy Award, a British Academy Film Award, a British Academy Television Award and a Tony Award.

Among Waterston's early film roles, it include his performance as Nick Carraway in the historical romance film The Great Gatsby (1974) for which he was nominated for two Golden Globe Awards for Best Supporting Actor – Motion Picture and New Star of the Year – Actor. He gained acclaim for his portrayal of war journalist Sydney Schanberg in the historical epic The Killing Fields (1984) for which he earned nominations for the Academy Award for Best Actor, the BAFTA Award for Best Actor in a Leading Role, and the Golden Globe Award for Best Actor in a Motion Picture – Drama. He lost to F. Murray Abraham for his role as Antonio Salieri in the period biographical drama epic Amadeus (1984).

On television, Waterston took an early role portraying theoretical physicist J. Robert Oppenheimer in the BBC Two historical drama miniseries Oppenheimer (1980) for which he was nominated for the British Academy Television Award for Best Actor and the Golden Globe Award for Best Actor – Miniseries or Television Film. Waterston gained stardom and notoriety for playing District Attorney Jack McCoy in the popular long running crime series Law and Order for which he received a Screen Actors Guild Award for Outstanding Actor in a Drama Series as well as nominations for a Golden Globe Award for Best Actor – Television Series Drama and three Primetime Emmy Awards for Outstanding Lead Actor in a Drama Series. He also played Forrest Bedford, the progressive district attorney in the NBC drama series I'll Fly Away (1991–1993) for which he won the Golden Globe Award for Best Actor – Television Series Drama as well as a nominations for two Primetime Emmy Awards.

On stage, Waterston portrayed Abraham Lincoln in the Broadway revival of the Robert E. Sherwood play Abe Lincoln in Illinois (1990) for which he was nominated for the Tony Award for Best Actor in a Play as well as the Drama Desk Award and the Outer Critics Circle Award.

== Major associations ==
=== Academy Awards ===
Year	Category	Nominated work	Result	Ref.
1984	Best Actor	The Killing Fields	Nominated	

=== BAFTA Awards ===
Year	Category	Nominated work	Result	Ref.
British Academy Film Awards
1984	Best Actor in a Leading Role	The Killing Fields	Nominated	
British Academy Television Awards
1981	Best Actor on Television	Oppenheimer	Nominated	

=== Emmy Awards ===
Year	Category	Nominated work	Result	Ref.
Primetime Emmy Awards
1974	Outstanding Supporting Actor in a Drama Series	The Glass Menagerie	Nominated	
1992	Outstanding Lead Actor in a Drama Series	I'll Fly Away (episode: "Hard Lessons Master Magician")	Nominated	
1993	Outstanding Lead Actor in a Drama Series	I'll Fly Away (episode: "All in the Life")	Nominated	
1994	Outstanding Lead Actor in a Miniseries or a Movie	I'll Fly Away: Then and Now	Nominated	
1996	Outstanding Informational Series	Time Life's Lost Civilizations	Won	
1997	Outstanding Lead Actor in a Drama Series	Law & Order (episode: "Mad Dog")	Nominated	
1999	Outstanding Lead Actor in a Drama Series	Law & Order (episode: "Sideshow")	Nominated	
2000	Outstanding Lead Actor in a Drama Series	Law & Order (episode: "Killerz")	Nominated	

=== Golden Globe Awards ===
Year	Category	Nominated work	Result	Ref.
1974	Best Supporting Actor – Motion Picture	The Great Gatsby	Nominated	
1974	New Star of the Year – Actor	The Great Gatsby	Nominated	
1982	Best Actor – Miniseries or Television Film	Oppenheimer	Nominated	
1984	Best Actor – Motion Picture Drama	The Killing Fields	Nominated	
1991	Best Actor – Television Series Drama	I'll Fly Away (season one)	Nominated	
1992	Best Actor – Television Series Drama	I'll Fly Away (season two)	Won	
1994	Best Actor – Television Series Drama	Law & Order	Nominated	

=== Screen Actors Guild Awards ===
Year	Category	Nominated work	Result	Ref.
1994	Outstanding Ensemble in a Drama Series	Law and Order	Nominated	
1995	Outstanding Ensemble in a Drama Series	Law and Order	Nominated	
1996	Outstanding Ensemble in a Drama Series	Law and Order	Nominated	
1997	Outstanding Ensemble in a Drama Series	Law and Order	Nominated	
1997	Outstanding Male Actor in a Drama Series	Law and Order	Nominated	
1998	Outstanding Male Actor in a Drama Series	Law and Order	Won	
1998	Outstanding Ensemble in a Drama Series	Law and Order	Nominated	
1999	Outstanding Ensemble in a Drama Series	Law and Order	Nominated	
2000	Outstanding Ensemble in a Drama Series	Law and Order	Nominated	
2001	Outstanding Ensemble in a Drama Series	Law and Order	Nominated	
2003	Outstanding Ensemble in a Drama Series	Law and Order	Nominated	

=== Tony Awards ===
Year	Category	Nominated work	Result	Ref.
1994	Best Actor in a Play	Abe Lincoln in Illinois	Nominated	

== Theatre awards ==
Organizations	Year	Category	Work	Result	Ref.
Drama Desk Awards	1994	Outstanding Actor in a Play	Abe Lincoln in Illinois	Nominated	
Drama League Awards	1994	Distinguished Performance	Abe Lincoln in Illinois	Won	
Outer Critics Circle Award	1994	Outstanding Actor in a Play	Abe Lincoln in Illinois	Nominated	

== Miscellaneous awards ==
Organizations	Year	Category	Work	Result	Ref.
Satellite Awards	1998	Best Actor – Television Series Drama	Law and Order	Nominated	
Satellite Awards	2000	Best Actor – Television Series Drama	Law and Order	Nominated	
Viewers for Quality Television	1992	Best Actor in a Quality Drama Series	I'll Fly Away	Nominated	
Viewers for Quality Television	1993	Best Actor in a Quality Drama Series	I'll Fly Away	Nominated	
Viewers for Quality Television	1998	Best Actor in a Quality Drama Series	Law and Order	Nominated	
Viewers for Quality Television	1999	Best Actor in a Quality Drama Series	Law and Order	Nominated	
Viewers for Quality Television	2000	Best Actor in a Quality Drama Series	Law and Order	Nominated	
