= Al Rockoff =

American photojournalist

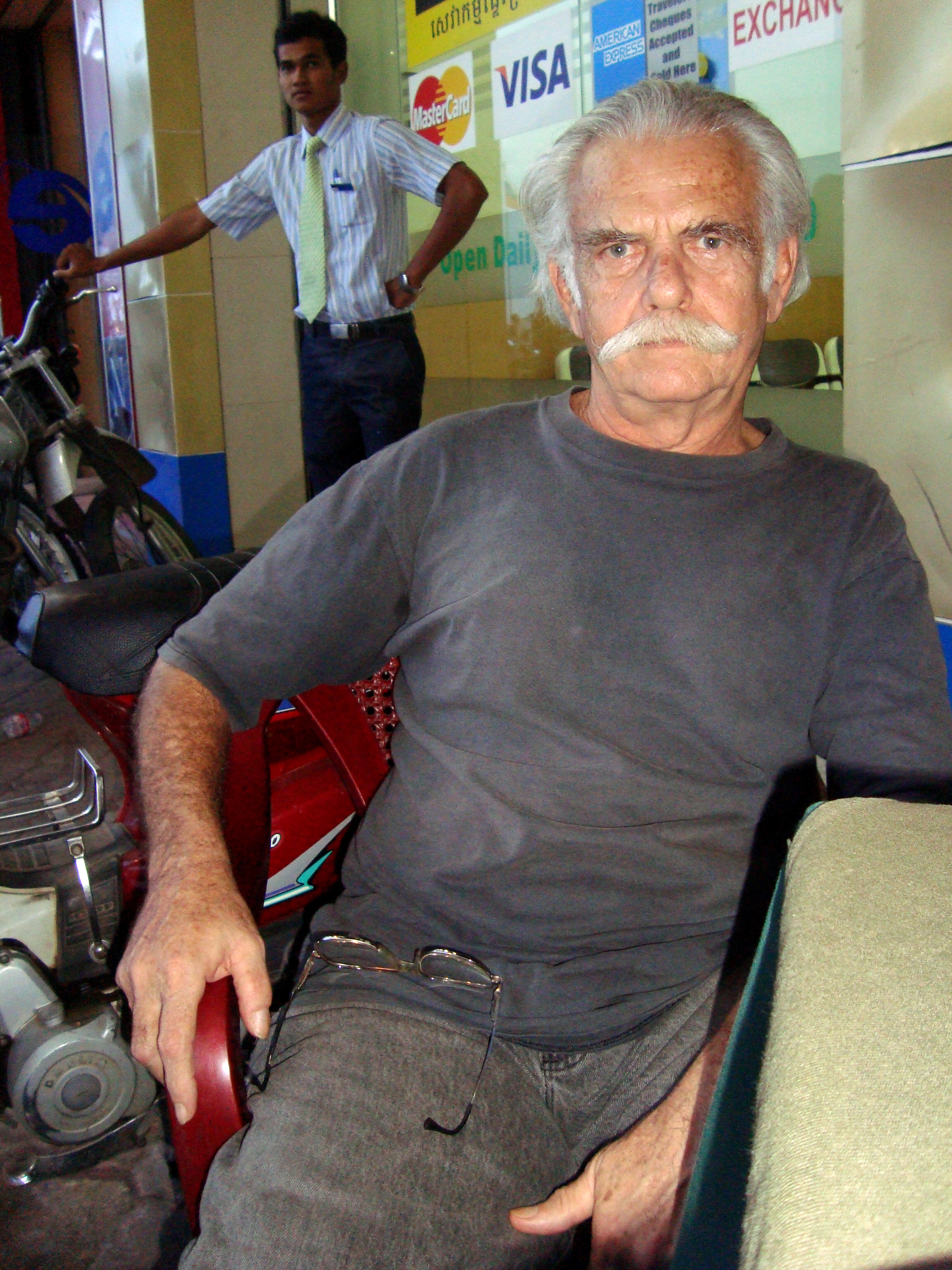

Al Rockoff (born 1946) is an American photojournalist made famous by his coverage of the Vietnam War and of the Khmer Rouge takeover of Phnom Penh, Cambodia's capital. He was portrayed in the Academy Award-winning film The Killing Fields by actor John Malkovich, although he has never been happy with this portrayal. Rockoff was born in Pawtucket, Rhode Island and is of half Russian and half Irish ancestry. After enlisting in the Navy while under age, he subsequently became an Army photographer in South Vietnam.

== Career ==
After several years in Vietnam, Rockoff came to the Cambodian capital of Phnom Penh in the spring of 1973, when the US-backed government of Lon Nol was fighting the Khmer Rouge insurgents. Both houses of Congress had voted to end USAF bombing missions over Cambodia that summer, and many journalists expected the fall of Phnom Penh was imminent.

Rockoff was known to take tremendous risks to get his pictures at a time when any foreign journalist falling into Khmer Rouge hands could expect execution. In October 1974, he was badly wounded by shrapnel in an attack near the strategic city of Kampong Chhnang, and technically “died” for several minutes before his heart was revived by a Swedish Red Cross team. In April 1975, Rockoff was one of five US newsmen to remain in Phnom Penh when the US embassy launched a helicopter evacuation of its staff. On the morning of the city's fall, he was visiting the Preah Keth Melea hospital with reporters Sydney Schanberg of The New York Times and Jon Swain of The Sunday Times when they were arrested by a furious company of teenage Khmer Rouge soldiers. Only the intervention of Schanberg's assistant Dith Pran saved their lives.

Most westerners took refuge in the French embassy from which they were taken by truck to Thailand two weeks later. But Cambodian citizens sheltering there, including government ministers seeking asylum, were ordered out. No exceptions were allowed, although some Cambodian women married to westerners could remain if they had documentation. Some did not survive the forced exodus to the countryside where they were expected to work in the fields. Rockoff tried to forge a passport for Dith Pran using an old passport belonging to Jon Swain. He is incensed at the way the 'Killing Fields' movie portrayed this, particularly scenes which appear to show him fixing up an improvised dark room and chemical solution while a photo of Pran fades away, until he finally gets it. In reality, Pran had an old photograph which Rockoff successfully attached to a passport. Eventually, Pran left the embassy of his own volition.

Rockoff splits his time between his homes in Phnom Penh, Cambodia, and Fort Lauderdale, Florida, US. He still works as a photographer. Some of his images have been exhibited in The Foreign Correspondent's Club in Phnom Penh and he continues to work on a book of photos about Cambodian history since 1970. Controversy continues to surround his photography: He voted against Al Gore in the 2000 US Presidential election over an incident reputed to have occurred when both served in Vietnam.

In 2008, Rockoff worked on collaborations with artist Shepard Fairey. These combine Rockoff's images of the Vietnam War and the Khmer Rouge with a modern poster art style. In December 2008, Rockoff exhibited his images of the fall of Phnom Penh for the first time in the US at Composition Gallery in Atlanta.
