= Killing Fields =

Sites of mass execution by the Khmer Rouge

Coordinates: 11°29′04″N 104°54′07″E

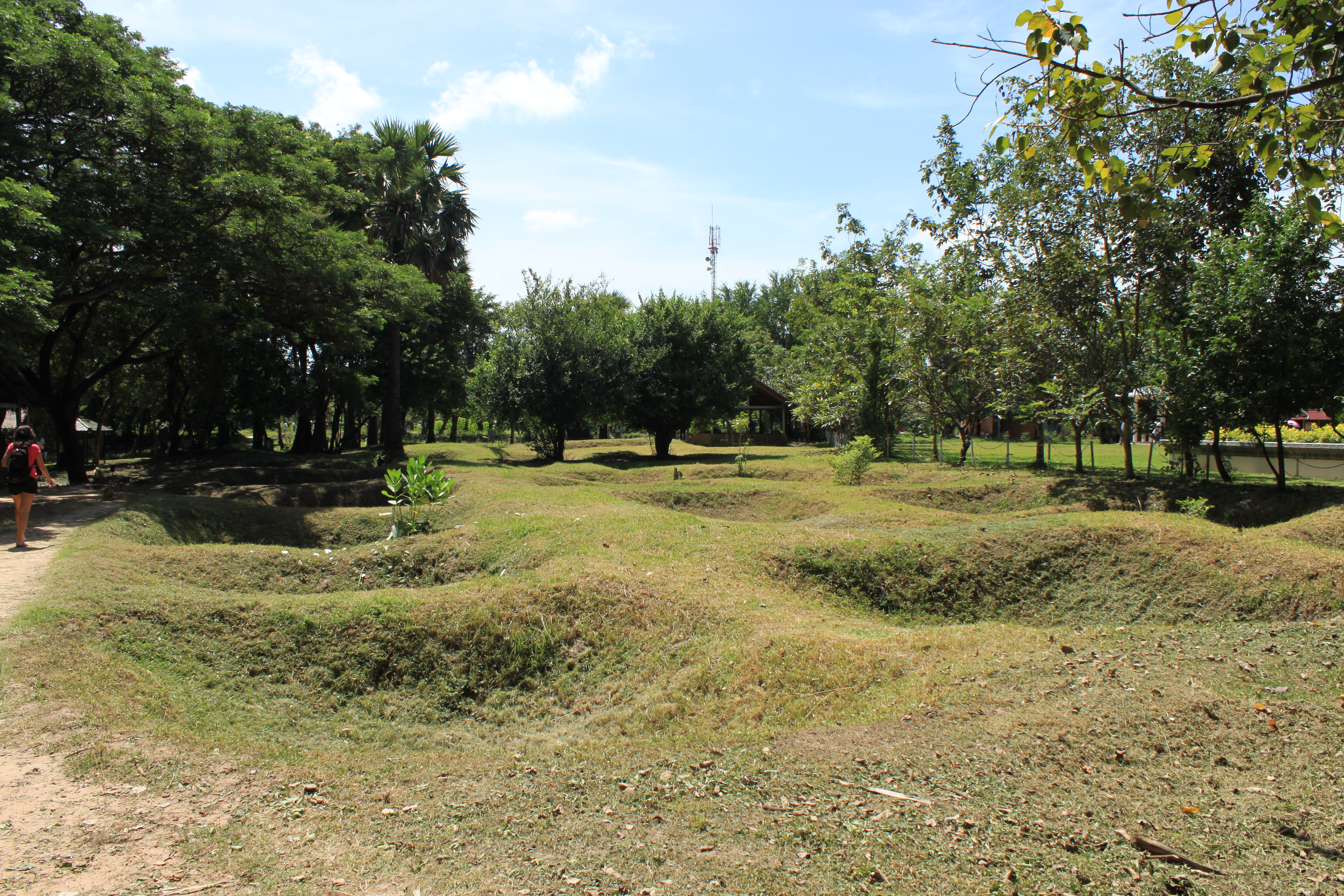
Mass graves at the Killing Fields of Choeung Ek

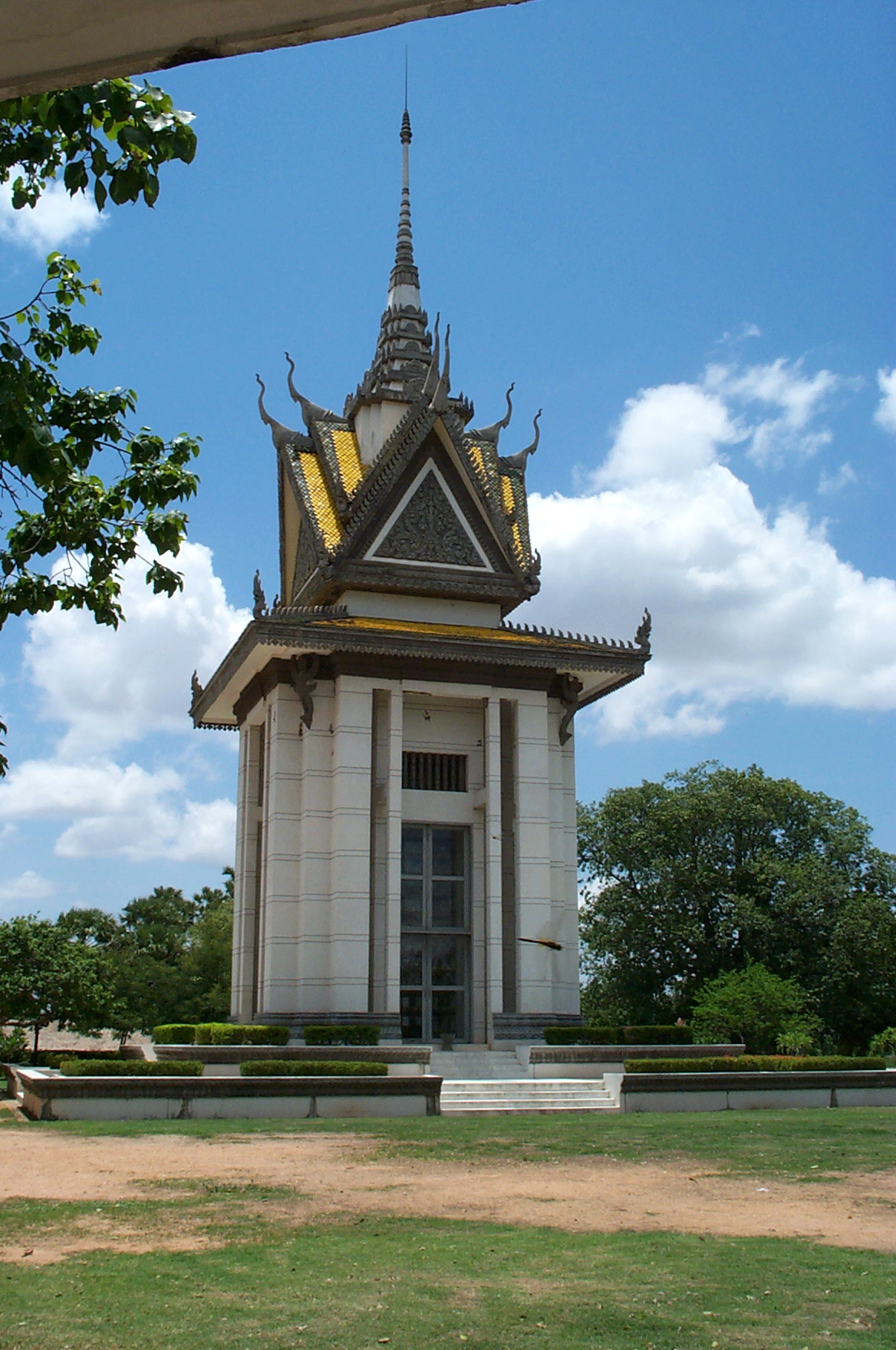
A commemorative stupa at Choeung Ek containing the skulls of victims

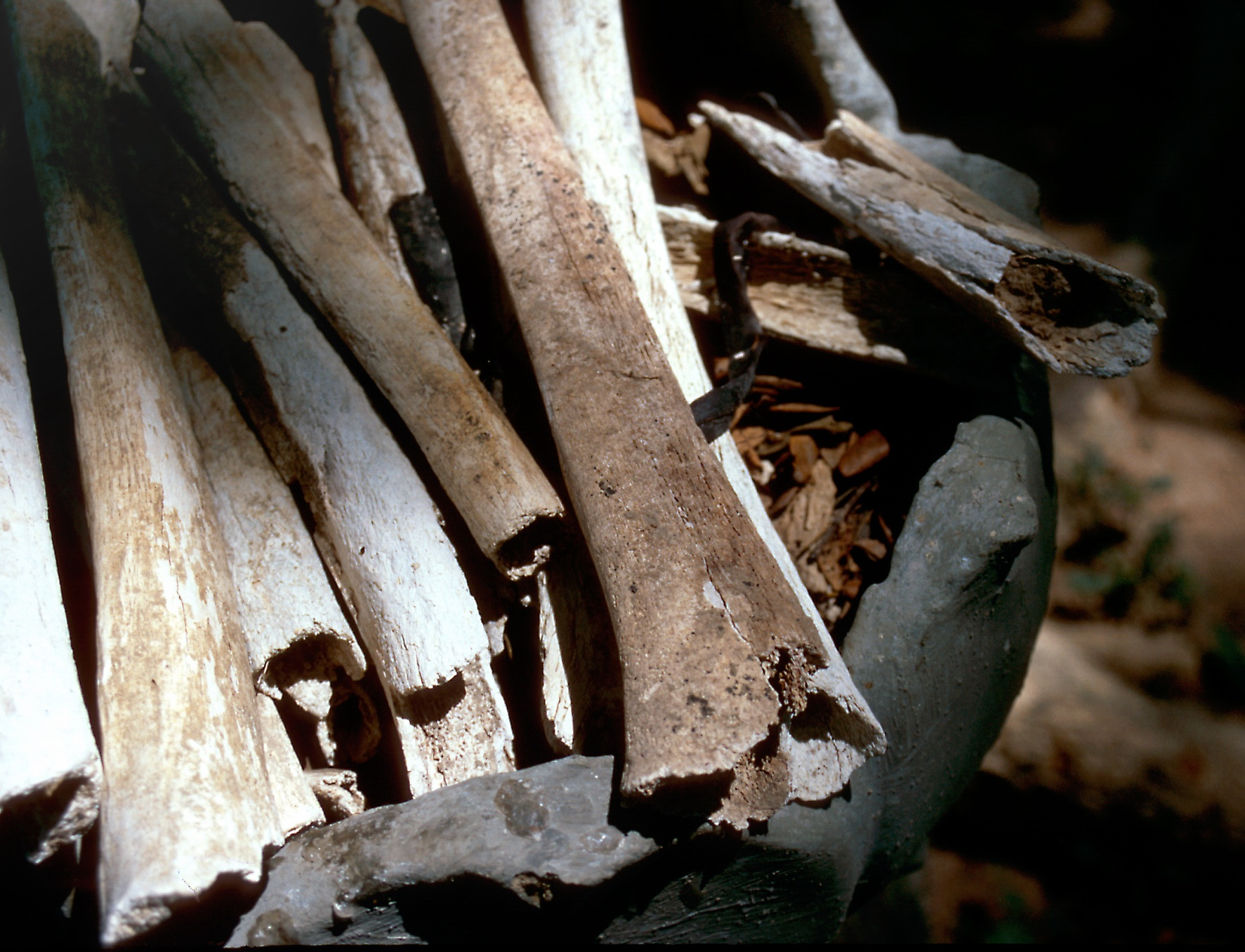
Human remains exposed at Choeung Ek after seasonal rainfall

The Killing Fields (Khmer: វាលពិឃាត, romanized: veal pikheat, [ʋiəl pikʰiət]) are a network of sites in Cambodia where large numbers of people were executed and buried by the Khmer Rouge regime during the period of Democratic Kampuchea from 1975 to 1979. The killings formed part of the Cambodian genocide, in which an estimated 1.7 to 2.2 million people died through execution, forced labour, starvation, and disease under the rule of the Communist Party of Kampuchea led by Pol Pot.

The term "killing fields" was popularised by Cambodian journalist Dith Pran, who survived the Khmer Rouge regime and later used the phrase to describe the mass execution sites scattered throughout the country. The phrase subsequently became internationally known through the 1984 film The Killing Fields.

More than 20,000 mass grave sites have been identified across Cambodia. Many victims were former officials of the Khmer Republic, members of the armed forces, intellectuals, professionals, teachers, religious figures, and civilians accused of political disloyalty or association with foreign governments. Ethnic and religious minorities, including ethnic Vietnamese, Chinese Cambodians, Chams, Thais, Christians, and Buddhist monks, were also systematically targeted.

Sociologist Martin Shaw described the Cambodian genocide as "the purest genocide of the Cold War era". The genocide ended in January 1979 when Vietnam invaded Cambodia during the Cambodian–Vietnamese War and overthrew the Khmer Rouge government.

== Background ==
Following the Khmer Rouge victory in the Cambodian Civil War on 17 April 1975, the new government evacuated major cities, abolished private property and currency, outlawed religion, and attempted to transform Cambodia into an agrarian socialist society. The leadership of Democratic Kampuchea pursued radical policies intended to eliminate perceived class enemies and create a self-sufficient revolutionary state.

The regime operated through the authority of the Angkar (អង្គការ, "the Organisation"), an opaque governing structure that exercised extensive control over daily life. Individuals suspected of disloyalty, dissent, or connections to foreign states were frequently arrested without trial. The security apparatus established prisons and interrogation centres throughout the country, the most notorious being Security Prison 21 (S-21), located in Phnom Penh.

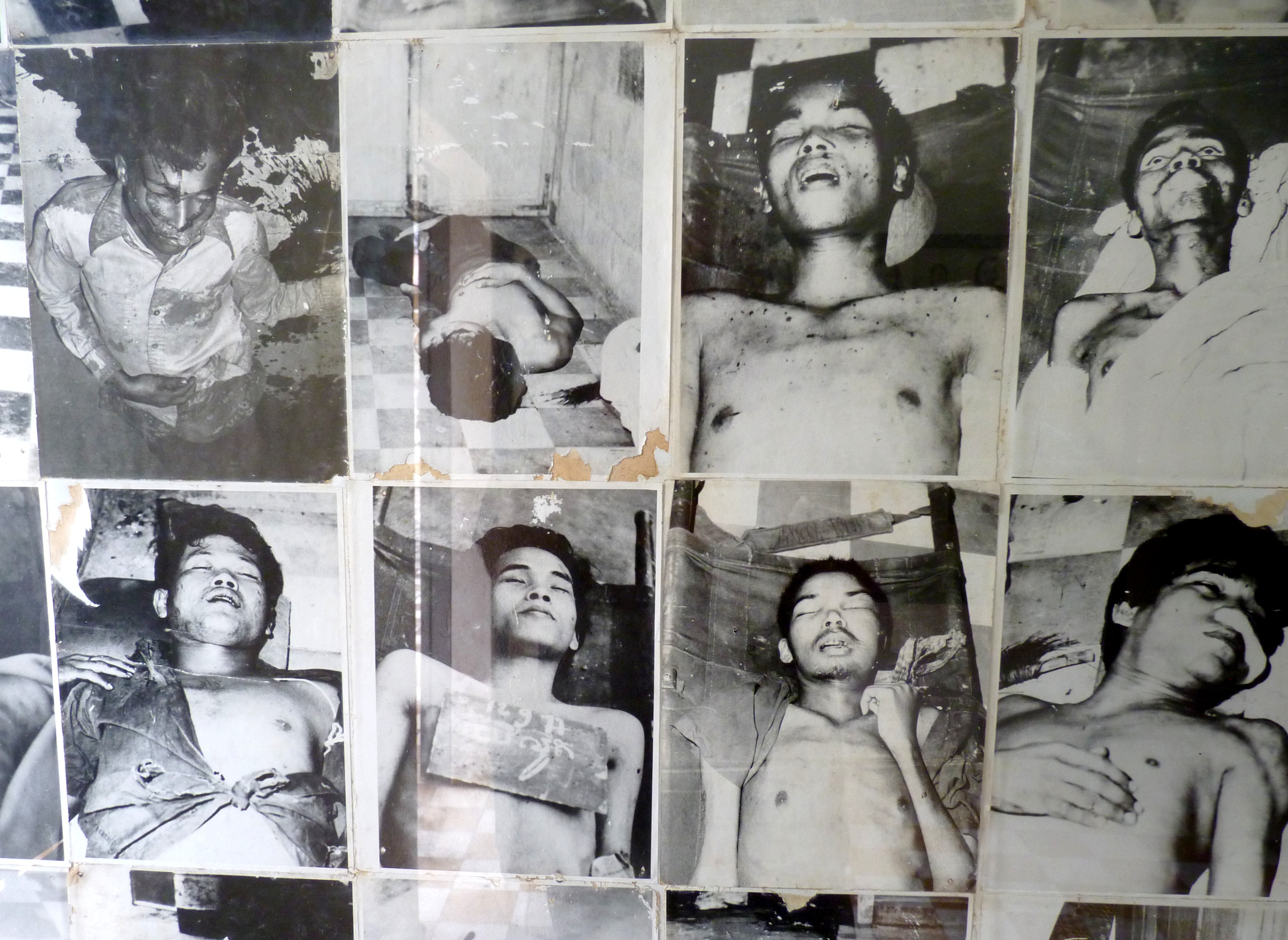
Victim photographs displayed at the Tuol Sleng Genocide Museum, formerly Security Prison 21 (S-21)

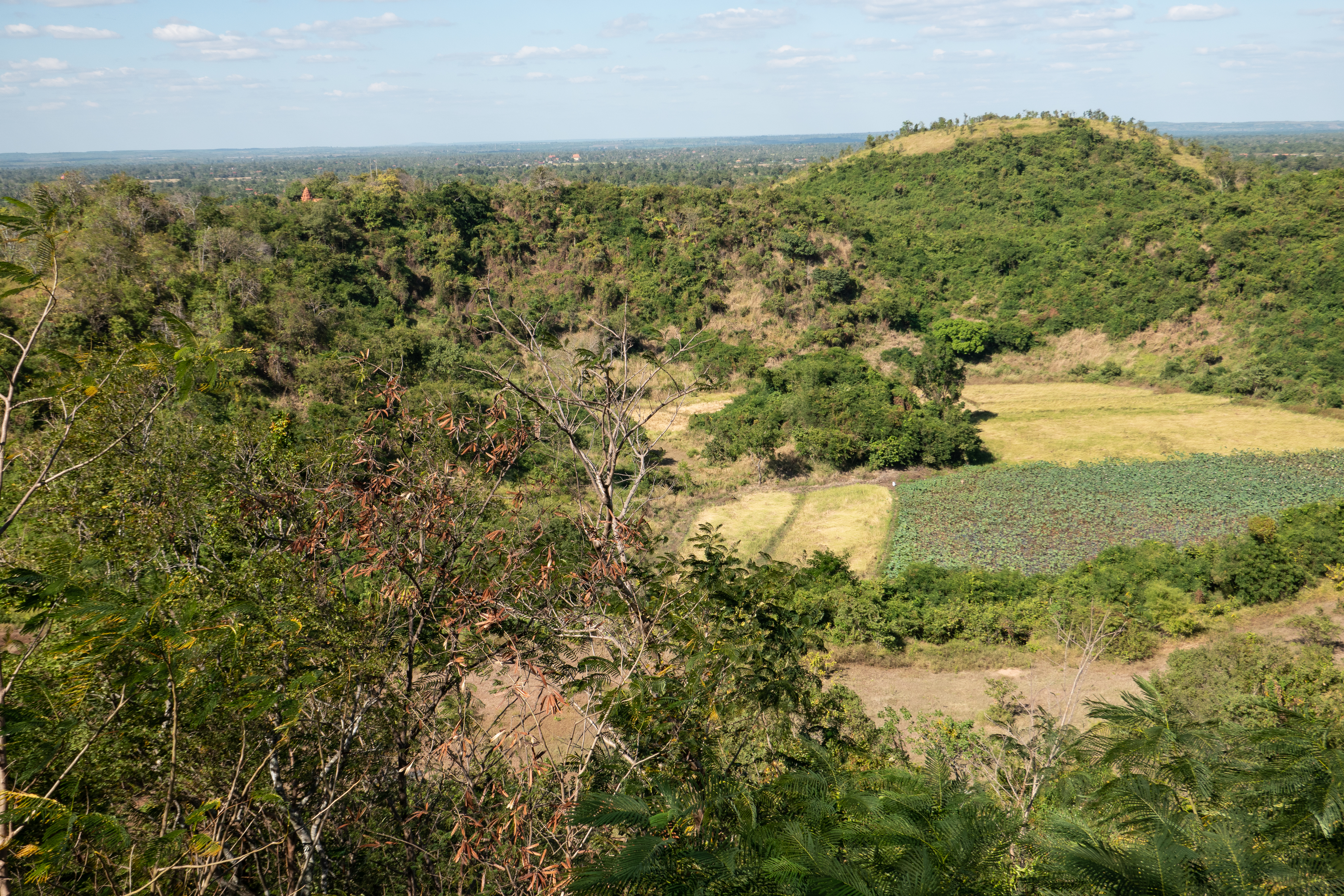
Mass grave site in Kampong Cham province

== Process of arrest and execution ==
Individuals accused of political crimes or ideological deviation were often subjected to interrogation, torture, and forced confessions. Confessions commonly included allegations of espionage, sabotage, or links to the Central Intelligence Agency, the KGB, or the Vietnamese government. Many detainees were coerced into naming relatives and acquaintances, contributing to wider purges within Khmer Rouge ranks and Cambodian society.

After interrogation, prisoners were transported to execution sites, many of which later became known as killing fields. Victims were usually executed without formal sentencing. To conserve ammunition, executions were often carried out using improvised weapons such as iron bars, hammers, machetes, axes, sharpened bamboo sticks, or farming tools.

At Choeung Ek, one of the best-known execution sites, forensic evidence and exhumed remains indicate that many victims suffered blunt-force trauma or injuries caused by edged weapons. Infants and children were sometimes killed alongside their parents, reflecting the regime's policy of eliminating perceived future threats to the revolution.

Bodies were buried in mass graves, many of which remain partially excavated or undisturbed. Human remains, fragments of clothing, and personal effects continue to emerge from the soil during periods of heavy rainfall.

== Death toll ==
Estimating the total number of deaths during the Khmer Rouge period remains difficult because of incomplete demographic records, famine-related mortality, and the destruction of documentation. Research conducted by the Documentation Center of Cambodia and other institutions identified more than 20,000 mass grave sites and estimated at least 1,386,734 victims of execution.

Broader estimates of deaths caused by Khmer Rouge policies range from approximately 1.7 million to 2.2 million people out of a national population of roughly 8 million in 1975.

Historian Ben Kiernan estimated that approximately 1.7 million people died during the genocide. Demographer Patrick Heuveline estimated a range between 1.2 million and 3.4 million deaths, while Marek Sliwinski estimated approximately 1.8 million deaths.

== Khmer Rouge Tribunal ==
In 1997, the Cambodian government requested assistance from the United Nations in establishing a tribunal to prosecute senior Khmer Rouge leaders. Negotiations between Cambodia and the UN resulted in the creation of the Extraordinary Chambers in the Courts of Cambodia (ECCC), a hybrid court applying both Cambodian and international law.

On 26 July 2010, Kang Kek Iew, commonly known as Duch, the former commandant of S-21 prison, was convicted of crimes against humanity and grave breaches of the Geneva Conventions. His sentence was later increased to life imprisonment on appeal.

On 7 August 2014, senior Khmer Rouge leaders Nuon Chea and Khieu Samphan were convicted of crimes against humanity and sentenced to life imprisonment.

== Memorials and legacy ==
The most prominent memorial associated with the Killing Fields is located at Choeung Ek, approximately 15 kilometres south of Phnom Penh. The site contains mass graves, preserved evidence of executions, and a memorial stupa filled with the skulls and bones of victims recovered from the surrounding area.

Many former prisons and execution sites throughout Cambodia have since been converted into memorials and museums documenting the atrocities of the Khmer Rouge period. The Tuol Sleng Genocide Museum, formerly S-21 prison, houses photographs, interrogation records, and torture instruments used by the regime.

The Cambodian genocide has had a lasting impact on Cambodian society, including demographic disruption, psychological trauma, destruction of cultural and religious institutions, and the loss of a significant portion of the country's educated population. Annual commemorations and educational initiatives continue to address the historical legacy of the Khmer Rouge era both within Cambodia and internationally.

In May 2004, Cambodian genocide survivor Dara Duong founded the Killing Fields Museum in Seattle, Washington, dedicated to preserving the history and memory of the genocide.

== See also ==
- Alive in the Killing Fields
- Bibliography of the Cambodian genocide
- Crimes against humanity under communist regimes
- Enemies of the People
- First They Killed My Father
- Funan
- Killing caves of Phnom Sampeau
- Mass killings under communist regimes
- Son Sen
- Ta Mok
- The Killing Fields
