= Denis Cameron (photographer) =

American photojournalist (1928–2006)

- Born: October 19, 1928; Minneapolis, Minnesota, U.S.
- Died: October 6, 2006 (aged 77); London, United Kingdom
- Occupation: Photojournalist
- Children: 2

Denis Cameron (October 19, 1928 – October 6, 2006) was an American photojournalist who was best known for his war photography.

== Biography ==
Cameron was born on October 19, 1928, in Minneapolis, Minnesota. He took on a variety of jobs, including work as a pilot in Alaska. In the mid-1950s, he began working as a Hollywood stills photographer. He worked on the sets of several movies, including Birdman of Alcatraz, The Man Who Shot Liberty Valance, and A Funny Thing Happened on the Way to the Forum. He was later employed by Life magazine.

In 1963, Cameron covered the war in Cyprus together with Don McCullin. Next, he was a photojournalist in the Six-Day War of 1967. One of the notable photographs he captured, picturing lieutenant Yossi Ben Hanan triumphantly clutching an AK-47 rifle, captioned "Israeli soldier cools off in the Suez Canal", was used on the cover of Life magazine.

As a photographer, he was present on site of the Prague Spring of 1968. In late 1969, he was sent on assignment by Time and Newsweek to Southeast Asia. He stayed there for six years, documenting the Vietnam War, the Laotian Civil War, and the Cambodian Civil War. On February 11, 1974, he suffered burns on his legs and right arm while covering an artillery attack in Cambodia. He unsuccessfully attempted to prepare an evacuation of hundreds of orphans by plane. In 1975, when most war correspondents fled Cambodia, Cameron stayed in Phnom Penh. He spent a month imprisoned in the French embassy together with 20 other journalists, including Sydney Schanberg and Jon Swain, before being released to Thailand. He was a consultant for the 1984 film The Killing Fields about the Khmer Rouge regime in Cambodia, but upon watching the completed film, he sought to have his consultative credit removed.

In his book "The Gate", French anthropologist Francois Bizot describes the chaotic final days in the French embassy when the Khmer Rouge entered to search and ensure that no film or photographic evidence left the country. He writes “The Khmer Rouge stopped at random beside a large, flat bag made of stiff fabric that was lying on the floor. Its owner, Denis Cameron, was standing in front of us, and he was asked to open it. The reporter calmly bent down, without the least embarrassment, to show what it contained...The case was full of the embassy’s antique silverware, engraved with the arms of the French Republic. I saw the expression on the consul’s face transform, and his body swell with rage. He picked up the heavy suitcase as if it were a wisp of straw and tipped its entire contents out over the man speechless in front of us: a ewer, a candlestick, a gravy boat, a platter, and a solid silver bowl, came clanging down and bounced onto the floor, watched by the Khmer Rouge, who had no idea what was going on.”

He was present on site of the Lebanese Civil War, the Iranian Revolution, the fall of the Berlin Wall, and the Gulf War.

== Personal life ==
Cameron lived in Los Angeles, Paris, and London. He was married twice and had two children: a son and a daughter. He had dementia and Parkinson's disease and died at the Royal Free Hospital in London on October 6, 2006.
