= Yossi Ben Hanan =

Israeli general

- יוסי בן-חנן
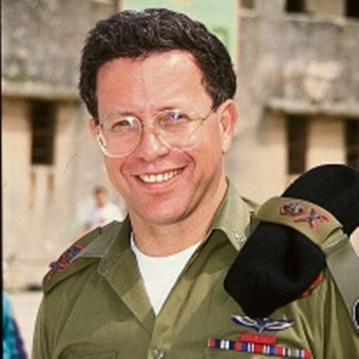
- General Yossi Ben Hanan 1994
- Born: February 23, 1945 (age 81); Jerusalem, Mandate for Palestine
- Military career
- Allegiance: Israel
- Service years: 1963-1994
- Rank: Aluf
- Unit: Armored Corps
- Commands: 7th Brigade
- Conflicts: Six-Day War; War of Attrition; Yom Kippur War
- Awards: Medal of Courage

Aluf (res.) Yossi Ben Hanan (Hebrew: יוסי בן-חנן) is a former Israeli general.

== Early life ==
Ben Hanan was born in Jerusalem, Mandate for Palestine in 1945. His father, Michael Ben Hanan served as one of the top Haganah commanders in Jerusalem.

== Military career ==
=== Six-Day War ===
During the Six-Day War, Ben Hanan was a lieutenant, serving as the operations officer of the 7th Armored Brigade. He was featured on the cover of Life magazine after the war which showed him triumphantly clutching an AK-47 rifle, under the caption "Israeli soldier cools off in the Suez Canal" (photo taken by Denis Cameron).

=== Yom Kippur War ===
In 1973, while on his honeymoon in Nepal, then-lieutenant colonel Ben Hanan learned of the outbreak of the Yom Kippur War. Over the course of a few days, he returned to Israel and arrived on the Golan Heights on October 8, 1973. He participated in fighting against the Syrian military in the holding defence of the Golan Heights along with then lieutenant colonel Avigdor Kahalani, and was wounded for the first time, but refused to be evacuated and continued fighting.

On October 9, 1973, Ben Hanan took command of the tank company put together from the remnants of the decimated 188th Armored Brigade by Shmuel Askarov, one of the survivors. Leading his command in a battle against overwhelming numbers of Syrian T-62s in the area north of Quneitra, Ben Hanan restored the tactical situation and penetrated with his unit deep into Syrian territory. On October 12, 1973 he was wounded for the third time, but refused to evacuate. He had led a further attack during which his tank was hit by a Sagger anti-tank missile, and Ben Hanan was wounded for the fourth time and rescued from behind enemy lines by Yonatan Netanyahu, a member of the IDF's elite Sayeret Matkal and brother of future Prime Minister Benjamin Netanyahu.

Ben Hanan received the second highest decoration, the Medal of Courage for his part in the battles of the Yom Kippur War.

=== Service following the Yom Kippur War ===
Following the Yom Kippur war, Ben Hanan commanded the 7th Armored Brigade, the IDF R&D department, the Israeli National Security College, and the Armored Corps. As a reservist, he attained the rank of Aluf (second highest rank of the IDF).

From 1997 to 2008, Ben Hanan was head of the Israeli Defense Ministry's developing countries defense assistance division, SIBAT.
