= The Killing Fields (film) =

1984 film by Roland Joffé

- US theatrical release poster
- Directed by: Roland Joffé
- Screenplay by: Bruce Robinson
- Based on: The Death and Life of Dith Pran by Sydney Schanberg
- Produced by: David Puttnam; Iain Smith
- Starring: Sam Waterston; Haing S. Ngor; Julian Sands; Craig T. Nelson; John Malkovich; Athol Fugard
- Cinematography: Chris Menges
- Edited by: Jim Clark
- Music by: Mike Oldfield
- Production companies: Goldcrest Films; International Film Investors; Enigma Productions
- Distributed by: Warner Bros. (through Columbia-EMI-Warner Distributors)
- Release date: 2 November 1984
- Running time: 142 minutes
- Country: United Kingdom
- Languages: English; French; Khmer
- Budget: $14.4 million
- Box office: $34.7 million

The Killing Fields is a 1984 British biographical drama film about the Khmer Rouge regime in Cambodia, which is based on the experiences of two journalists, Cambodian Dith Pran and American Sydney Schanberg. It was directed by Roland Joffé and produced by David Puttnam for Goldcrest Films. Sam Waterston stars as Schanberg, Haing S. Ngor as Pran, and John Malkovich as Al Rockoff. The adaptation for the screen was written by Bruce Robinson; the musical score was written by Mike Oldfield and orchestrated by David Bedford; and the costumes were designed by Judy Moorcroft.

The film was a success at the box office and an instant hit with critics. At the 57th Academy Awards it received seven Oscar nominations, including Best Picture; it won three, most notably Best Supporting Actor for Haing S. Ngor, who had no previous acting experience, as well as Best Cinematography and Best Editing. At the 38th British Academy Film Awards, it won eight BAFTAs, including Best Film and Best Actor in a Leading Role for Ngor.

In 1999, the British Film Institute voted The Killing Fields the 100th-greatest British film of the 20th century.

== Plot ==
In 1973, New York Times reporter Sydney Schanberg arrives in Phnom Penh to cover the civil war between the Cambodian national army and the communist Khmer Rouge. Schanberg is joined by photographer Al Rockoff and Dith Pran, a Cambodian journalist and interpreter. Pran and Schanberg travel to Neak Leung to investigate an alleged bombing by an American B-52. The pair are detained there trying to photograph the execution of two Khmer Rouge operatives. Schanberg is furious when the international press corps arrives with the U.S. Army.

Two years later, the Phnom Penh embassies are evacuated in anticipation of the Khmer Rouge's arrival. Schanberg helps evacuate Pran's family, but Pran stays behind to help. The Khmer Rouge move into the capital, ostensibly in peace, but Schanberg and Rockoff are arrested as the communists parade through the city and taken to an alley for execution. Pran, unharmed because he is a Cambodian civilian, negotiates the release of his friends and they flee to the French embassy where the Khmer Rouge demands all Cambodian citizens hidden inside. The fearful ambassador orders the Cambodian national to leave. Rockoff and fellow photographer Jon Swain try to forge a British passport, but lack adequate photographic fixer and the forgery is detected. Pran is turned over to the Khmer Rouge, who have installed a totalitarian regime.

Several months after returning to New York City, Schanberg launches a personal campaign to locate Pran; he writes letters to several charities and maintains close contact with Pran's family in San Francisco.

In Cambodia, Pran has become a forced labourer under the Khmer Rouge's "Year Zero" policy, a return to the agrarian ways of the past. Pran is also forced to attend propagandist classes where many undergo re-education. As intellectuals are made to disappear, Pran feigns simple-mindedness. Eventually, he escapes and stumbles upon one of the Pol Pot regime's Killing Fields before he is found unconscious on the riverside and taken in by a different cadre of Khmer Rouge.

In 1976, Schanberg receives a prestigious award for his coverage of the Cambodian conflict and tells the audience that half the recognition belongs to Pran. Rockoff accuses Schanberg of not doing enough to locate Pran, suggesting he callously used him to win the award. Schanberg reluctantly admits Pran stayed because of what Schanberg wanted.

Pran lives in a Khmer Rouge-held village led by a man named Phat, doing household chores and tending to Phat's young son. Phat probes Pran's understanding of French and English, but Pran continues to successfully hide his education, claiming to have been a taxi driver before the revolution. When Phat catches Pran listening to English language radio, he confides in Pran his distrust of the Khmer Rouge leadership, and asks him to take ward of his son in the event he is killed.

During the Khmer Rouge's border war with Vietnam, Pran discovers Phat's son has American money and a map leading to safety. Phat is killed trying to stop younger Khmer Rouge officers from killing several of his comrades. In the confusion, Pran escapes into the jungle with four of Phat's comrades and his son. Three of the comrades split from the group and Pran continues following the map with the fourth man until the latter activates a land mine while holding the boy, killing them both. Pran continues alone and encounters a Red Cross refugee camp near the border with Thailand. Schanberg, informed Pran is alive, reunites with Pran at the Red Cross camp. Pran assures Schanberg of his forgiveness and the two embrace.

== Cast ==
- Sam Waterston as Sydney Schanberg
- Haing S. Ngor as Dith Pran — Like Pran, Ngor was a refugee and survivor of the Cambodian genocide, surviving three terms in Cambodian prison camps before escaping, years prior to making the film.
- John Malkovich as Al Rockoff
- Julian Sands as Jon Swain
- Craig T. Nelson as Major Reeves
- Spalding Gray as U.S. Consul
- Bill Paterson as Dr MacEntire
- Athol Fugard as Dr Sundesval
- Graham Kennedy as Dougal
- Patrick Malahide as Morgan
- Nell Campbell as Beth
- Joanna Merlin as Schanberg's Sister
- Monirak Sisowath as Phat

== Production ==
In an interview with The Guardian in November 2014, Joffé said:

David Puttnam asked to see me, which in those days was a bit like being invited out to Hollywood. He gave me Bruce Robinson's script, which was enormous, but it was so full of passion and energy I couldn't put it down. I'd heard about Cambodia and the Khmer Rouge, but didn't know much until I read it. I wrote to David saying that whoever made the film would have to be careful because it wasn't just a war story: it was about human connection, how friendships are born and what they do to us. I didn't hear from him for six months, then we bumped into one another and he said he'd interviewed most of the directors in the world – including some very big names who would make the studios happy – but no one had really understood it. "You're the only man who has," he said.

In the same interview actor Julian Sands said:

Roland's audition process was extraordinary. I was 24 and I've never come across anything as rigorous since. He was looking to put together a troupe of actors without much film experience, because he wanted the freshness of everything to resonate with us. He would gather lots of us in his office to improvise scenes. After about a month, he had a group he found interesting. John Malkovich, Sam Waterston and Haing S. Ngor weren't subject to that, but their meetings with him were still pretty intense. A lot was made of the fact that Haing hadn't acted before, but John put it differently: he said Haing had been acting his whole life – you had to be a pretty good actor to survive the Khmer Rouge.

Puttnam recalled Yoko Ono's reaction to the use of John Lennon's "Imagine" in the film: "“The film ended, and she was in pieces. She climbed over the back of her chair, hugged me and cried. ‘I promise you this,’ she said: ‘This is exactly the way John would have liked the song to have been used.’ It was an amazing moment.”

== Box office ==
Goldcrest Films invested £8,419,000 in the film, which earned £10,664,000 in gross receipts. In South Korea, The Killing Fields achieved commercial success upon its release in 1985, attracting 925,994 admissions in Seoul and becoming the city's most-attended film of the 1980s.

== Critical reception ==
The Killing Fields holds a 91% rating and an average rating of 8.20/10 at the review aggregator Rotten Tomatoes, based on 45 reviews, with the consensus: "Artfully composed, powerfully acted, and fueled by a powerful blend of anger and empathy, The Killing Fields is a career-defining triumph for director Roland Joffé and a masterpiece of cinema." Metacritic, which uses a weighted average, assigned the film a score of 76 out of 100, based on 18 critics, indicating "generally favorable" reviews. Critic Roger Ebert wrote in the Chicago Sun-Times: "The film is a masterful achievement on all the technical levels—it does an especially good job of convincing us with its Asian locations—but the best moments are the human ones, the conversations, the exchanges of trust, the waiting around, the sudden fear, the quick bursts of violence, the desperation." John Simon of National Review wrote: "For all its flaws The Killing Fields is an important, indeed necessary, film."

The film has been criticized by some who lived through the actual events. Al Rockoff expressed dissatisfaction at the portrayals of him and Schanberg, while Denis Cameron sought to have his consultative credit removed upon watching the completed film.

=== Accolades ===
Award	Category	Nominee(s)	Result	Ref.
Academy Awards	Best Picture	David Puttnam	Nominated	
Academy Awards	Best Director	Roland Joffé	Nominated	
Academy Awards	Best Actor	Sam Waterston	Nominated	
Academy Awards	Best Supporting Actor	Haing S. Ngor	Won	
Academy Awards	Best Screenplay – Based on Material from Another Medium	Bruce Robinson	Nominated	
Academy Awards	Best Cinematography	Chris Menges	Won	
Academy Awards	Best Film Editing	Jim Clark	Won	
American Cinema Editors Awards	Best Edited Feature Film	Jim Clark	Nominated	
Boston Society of Film Critics Awards	Best Film		Won	
Boston Society of Film Critics Awards	Best Actor	Haing S. Ngor	Won	
Boston Society of Film Critics Awards	Best Supporting Actor	John Malkovich (Note: Also for Places in the Heart.)	Won	
Boston Society of Film Critics Awards	Best Cinematography	Chris Menges	Won	
British Academy Film Awards	Best Film	David Puttnam	Won	
British Academy Film Awards	Best Direction	Roland Joffé	Nominated	
British Academy Film Awards	Best Actor in a Leading Role	Haing S. Ngor	Won	
British Academy Film Awards	Best Actor in a Leading Role	Sam Waterston	Nominated	
British Academy Film Awards	Best Adapted Screenplay	Bruce Robinson	Won	
British Academy Film Awards	Best Cinematography	Chris Menges	Won	
British Academy Film Awards	Best Editing	Jim Clark	Won	
British Academy Film Awards	Best Make-Up Artist	Tommie Manderson	Nominated	
British Academy Film Awards	Best Production Design	Roy Walker	Won	
British Academy Film Awards	Best Score for a Film	Mike Oldfield	Nominated	
British Academy Film Awards	Best Sound	Ian Fuller, Clive Winter, and Bill Rowe	Won	
British Academy Film Awards	Best Special Visual Effects	Fred Cramer	Nominated	
British Academy Film Awards	Most Promising Newcomer to Leading Film Roles	Haing S. Ngor	Won	
British Society of Cinematographers Awards	Best Cinematography in a Theatrical Feature Film	Chris Menges	Won	
César Awards	Best Foreign Film	Roland Joffé	Nominated	
David di Donatello Awards	Best Foreign Film	Roland Joffé	Nominated	
David di Donatello Awards	Best Foreign Director	Roland Joffé	Nominated	
David di Donatello Awards	Best Foreign Producer	David Puttnam	Won	
Directors Guild of America Awards	Outstanding Directorial Achievement in Motion Pictures	Roland Joffé	Nominated	
Golden Globe Awards	Best Motion Picture – Drama		Nominated	
Golden Globe Awards	Best Actor in a Motion Picture – Drama	Sam Waterston	Nominated	
Golden Globe Awards	Best Supporting Actor – Motion Picture	Haing S. Ngor	Won	
Golden Globe Awards	Best Director – Motion Picture	Roland Joffé	Nominated	
Golden Globe Awards	Best Screenplay – Motion Picture	Bruce Robinson	Nominated	
Golden Globe Awards	Best Original Score – Motion Picture	Mike Oldfield	Nominated	
Japan Academy Film Prize	Outstanding Foreign Language Film		Nominated	
London Critics Circle Film Awards	Director of the Year	Roland Joffé	Won	
Los Angeles Film Critics Association Awards	Best Supporting Actor	John Malkovich	Runner-up	
Los Angeles Film Critics Association Awards	Best Cinematography	Chris Menges	Won	
National Board of Review Awards	Top Ten Films		3rd Place	
National Society of Film Critics Awards	Best Supporting Actor	John Malkovich	Won	
National Society of Film Critics Awards	Best Cinematography	Chris Menges (Note: Also for Comfort and Joy.)	Won	
New York Film Critics Circle Awards	Best Film		2nd Place	
New York Film Critics Circle Awards	Best Cinematographer	Chris Menges	Won	
Political Film Society Awards	Special Award		Won	
Writers Guild of America Awards	Best Screenplay – Based on Material from Another Medium	Bruce Robinson	Won	

Besides its place as 100th on the BFI Top 100 British films list, The Killing Fields is also 30th on Channel 4's list of the 100 Greatest Tearjerkers, and 60th on the AFI's 100 Years...100 Cheers list.

== Home media ==
The Killing Fields was released on DVD by Umbrella Entertainment in Australia in March 2010. The DVD includes special features such as the theatrical trailer, audio commentary with Roland Joffé, an interview with David Puttnam and a BBC documentary titled The Making of The Killing Fields. In April 2013 Umbrella Entertainment released the film on Blu-ray in Australia.

In the UK, the film was released on DVD and Blu-ray by Optimum Releasing and was released in North America on DVD twice by Warner Home Video, both as a regular release and later as part of their Warner Archive Collection.

In 2023, Australia's Imprint Films (a sublabel of the home media group ViaVision) released a 2-disc Blu-ray edition of The Killing Fields as part of the 4-film Directed By Roland Joffé box set. The Imprint Blu-ray of The Killing Fields contains extra features exclusive to the release.

== Casting of Haing S. Ngor ==
Haing S. Ngor, who plays Pran, was himself a survivor of the Khmer Rouge regime and the labour camps. Prior to the Khmer Rouge's 'Year Zero' he was a doctor based in Phnom Penh. In 1975, Ngor was one of millions who were moved from the city to forced labour camps in the countryside. He spent four years there before fleeing to Thailand.

Haing S. Ngor had never acted before appearing in The Killing Fields. He was spotted by the film's casting director, Pat Golden, at a Cambodian wedding in Los Angeles.

Of his role in the film, he told People magazine in 1985: "I wanted to show the world how deep starvation is in Cambodia, how many people die under Communist regime. My heart is satisfied. I have done something perfect."

Ngor became one of only two non-professional actors to win an Academy Award for acting, the other being Harold Russell (The Best Years of Our Lives, 1946).

== Related work ==
The screenplay is adapted from a Sydney Schanberg story in The New York Times Magazine entitled "The Death and Life of Dith Pran: A Story of Cambodia".

In 1986, actor Spalding Gray, who had a small role in the film as the American consul, created Swimming to Cambodia, a monologue (later filmed by Jonathan Demme) based upon his experiences making The Killing Fields.

A book of the film was written by Christopher Hudson.

== See also ==
- Alive in the Killing Fields (book)
- Shadow of Darkness
- The Gate
- BFI Top 100 British films
- List of historical drama films of Asia
