= Michael Ben-Hanan =

Early Zionist, Commander of the Haganah, Radio Broadcaster (1912–2001)

- מיכאל בן-חנן
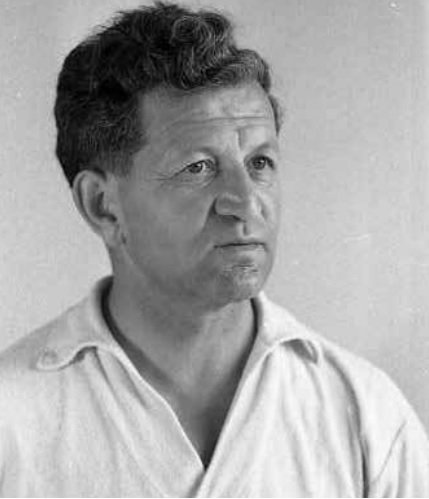
- Born: Michael Zamel; July 20, 1912
- Died: September 17, 2001 (aged 89); Israel
- Occupations: Commander of the Haganah, Broadcaster
- Known for: Founder of the IDF Science Corps, Israeli Radio Broadcaster

Signature
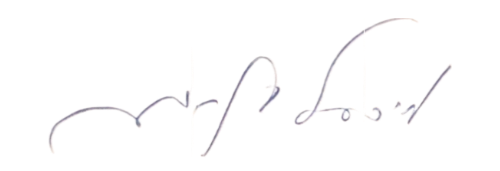

Michael Ben-Hanan (Hebrew: מיכאל בן-חנן; July 20, 1912 – September 17, 2001) was commander of the Haganah in Jerusalem, an educator, and Israeli radio broadcaster, who for thirty years broadcast a morning exercise program on the Kol Yerushalayim radio station and then on Kol Yisrael.

== Early life ==
Ben-Hanan was born in Poland in 1912. He studied physics, mathematics and physical education at the University of Frankfurt. In 1933, during the Nazi's rise to power in Germany, he immigrated to the British Mandate of Palestine.

== Career ==
He was one of the heads of the Haganah's organization in Jerusalem. He was one of the founders of the Haganah Military Academy in Jerusalem (later GDNA) and one of the founders of the IDF Science Corps. Simultaneously with his underground activities, he served as a math and gymnastics teacher in Jerusalem.

== Death ==
Michael Ben-Hanan died on September 17, 2001 and was buried at Har HaMenuchot.
