= Roy Walker (production designer) =

British production designer

- Born: 1931; Tonbridge, Kent, England
- Died: 6 January 2013 (aged 81–82)
- Occupation: Production designer
- Years active: 1953–2001
- Awards: Academy Award, British Academy Film Award

Roy Walker (1931 – 6 January 2013) was a British production designer. He won an Academy Award and was nominated for two more in the Best Art Direction category. Born in Kent, England in 1931, Walker began his career at 16. He collaborated with many film directors, most notably David Lean, Stanley Kubrick and Roland Joffe.

== Selected filmography ==
- Strictly for the Birds (1964) (as art director)
- Doctor Zhivago (1965) (as assistant art director)
- A Man for All Seasons (1966) (as assistant art director)
- Oliver! (1968) (as assistant art director)
- The Looking Glass War (1970) (as assistant art director)
- Ryan's Daughter (1970) (as art director)
- The Last Run (1971) (as art director)
- The Strange Vengeance of Rosalie (1972) (as art director)
- Hitler: The Last Ten Days (1973)
- Tales That Witness Madness (1973) (as art director)
- Barry Lyndon (1975) (as art director)
- Russian Roulette (1975) (as art director)
- Sorcerer (1977) (as art director)
- The Shining (1980)
- Green Ice (1981)
- Yentl (1983)
- The Killing Fields (1984)
- Eleni (1985)
- Little Shop of Horrors (1986)
- Good Morning, Vietnam (1987)
- Dirty Rotten Scoundrels (1988)
- City of Joy (1992)
- The Scarlet Letter (1995)
- Eyes Wide Shut (1999)
- The Talented Mr. Ripley (1999)
- Waterproof (2000) (as production designer and associate producer)

== Awards ==
Walker won an Academy Award for Best Art Direction and was nominated for two more:

Won

- Barry Lyndon (1975)

Nominated

- Yentl (1983)
- The Talented Mr. Ripley (1999)

He also won a BAFTA Award for Best Production Design for:

- The Killing Fields (1984)
