= Sam Waterston =

American actor (born 1940)

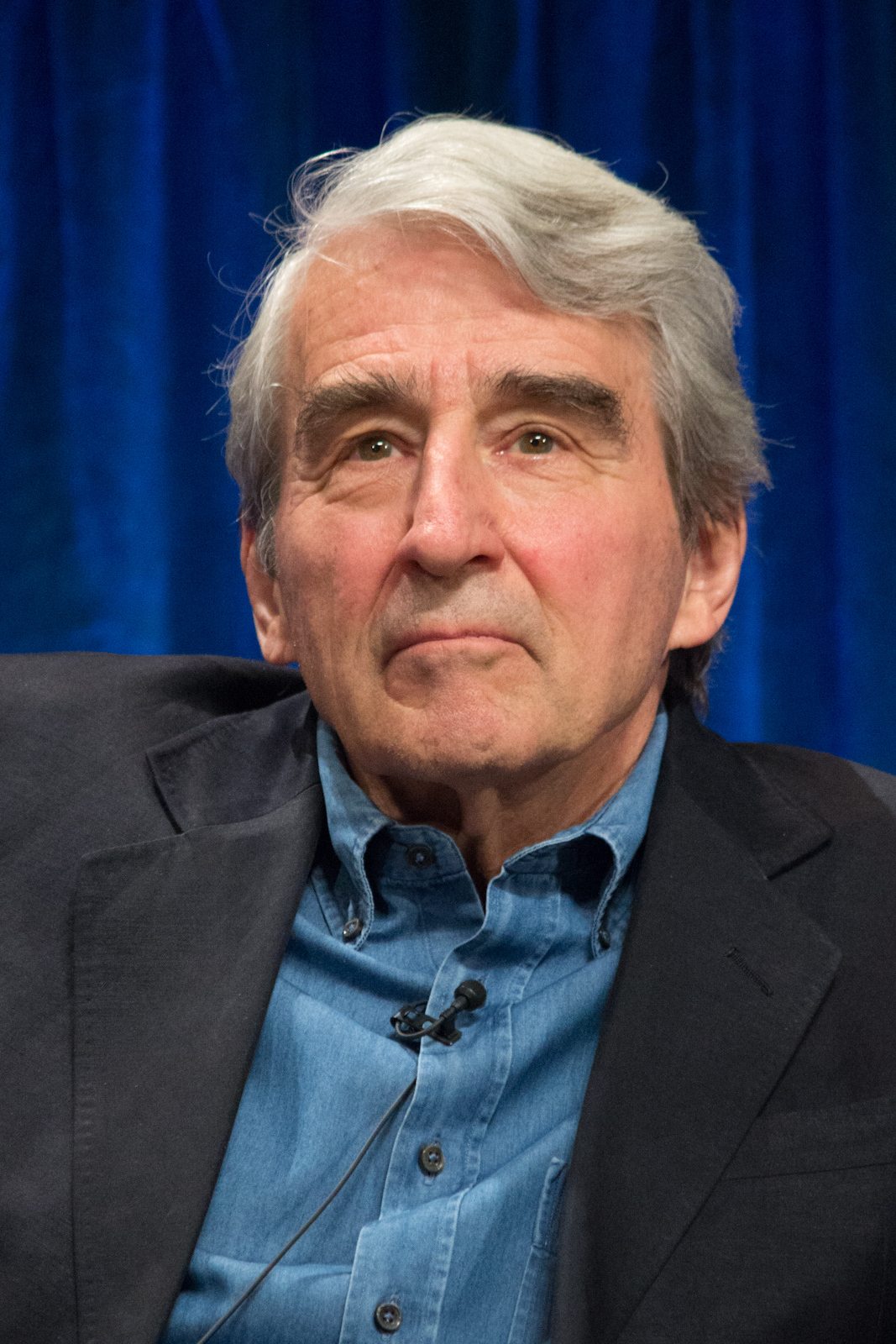
- Waterston at the PaleyFest 2013 panel for The Newsroom
- Born: Samuel Atkinson Waterston; November 15, 1940 (age 86); Cambridge, Massachusetts, U.S.
- Education: Yale University (BA)
- Occupation: Actor
- Years active: 1962–present
- Spouses: Barbara Rutledge Johns (m. 1964; div. 1975); Lynn Louisa Woodruff (m. 1976)
- Children: 4, including James and Katherine
- Awards: Full list

Samuel Atkinson Waterston (born November 15, 1940) is an American actor. Waterston is known for his work in theater, television, and film. He has received numerous accolades including a Primetime Emmy Award, Golden Globe Award, and Screen Actors Guild Award as well as nominations for an Academy Award, a Tony Award, and two BAFTA Awards. His acting career has spanned over five decades acting on stage and screen. Waterston received a star on the Hollywood Walk of Fame in 2010 and was inducted into the American Theater Hall of Fame in 2012.

Waterston studied at the Sorbonne in Paris and the American Actors Workshop. He started his career in theater on the New York City stage, appearing in multiple revivals of Shakespeare. Waterston starred in numerous productions at the Public Theatre including Indians (1969), The Trial of Catonsville Nine (1970), A Doll's House (1975), Hamlet (1975), Measure for Measure (1977), and Benefactors (1980). He portrayed Abraham Lincoln on Broadway in Abe Lincoln in Illinois (1993) where he received a Tony Award for Best Actor in a Play nomination.

On film, he played Nick Carraway in The Great Gatsby (1974) earning a Golden Globe nomination. For his portrayal of Sydney Schanberg in Roland Joffe's The Killing Fields (1984) he was nominated for the Academy Award for Best Actor. He has acted in several Woody Allen films including Interiors (1978), Hannah and Her Sisters (1986), September (1987), and Crimes and Misdemeanors (1989). He also acted in Hopscotch (1980), Heaven's Gate (1980), The Man in the Moon (1991), Serial Mom (1994), Nixon (1995), Miss Sloane (2016) and On the Basis of Sex (2018).

Waterston gained prominence for his portrayal of Jack McCoy on the NBC crime series Law & Order (1994–2010, 2022–2024), for which he received a Screen Actors Guild Award along with Golden Globe Award and Emmy Award nominations. He played Charlie Skinner in Aaron Sorkin's HBO drama series The Newsroom (2012–2014). He was BAFTA nominated for portraying J. Robert Oppenheimer in the BBC miniseries Oppenheimer (1980). He has also acted in Lincoln (1988), Godless (2017), Grace and Frankie (2015–2022), and The Dropout (2022).

== Early life and education ==
Samuel Atkinson Waterston was born on November 15, 1940, in Cambridge, Massachusetts, the third of four children of George Chychele Waterston, a semanticist and language teacher, and Alice Tucker (née Atkinson), a landscape painter. Waterston's mother was an Old Stock American of English ancestry, and a descendant of passengers on the Mayflower; his father was a Scottish immigrant who emigrated to the U.S. via England. His siblings are Roberta, George, and Ellen Waterston.

Waterston attended high school at the Groton School, graduating in the class of 1958. He earned his Bachelor of Arts (BA) degree from Yale College in 1962.

== Career ==
=== 1963–1973: Early roles ===
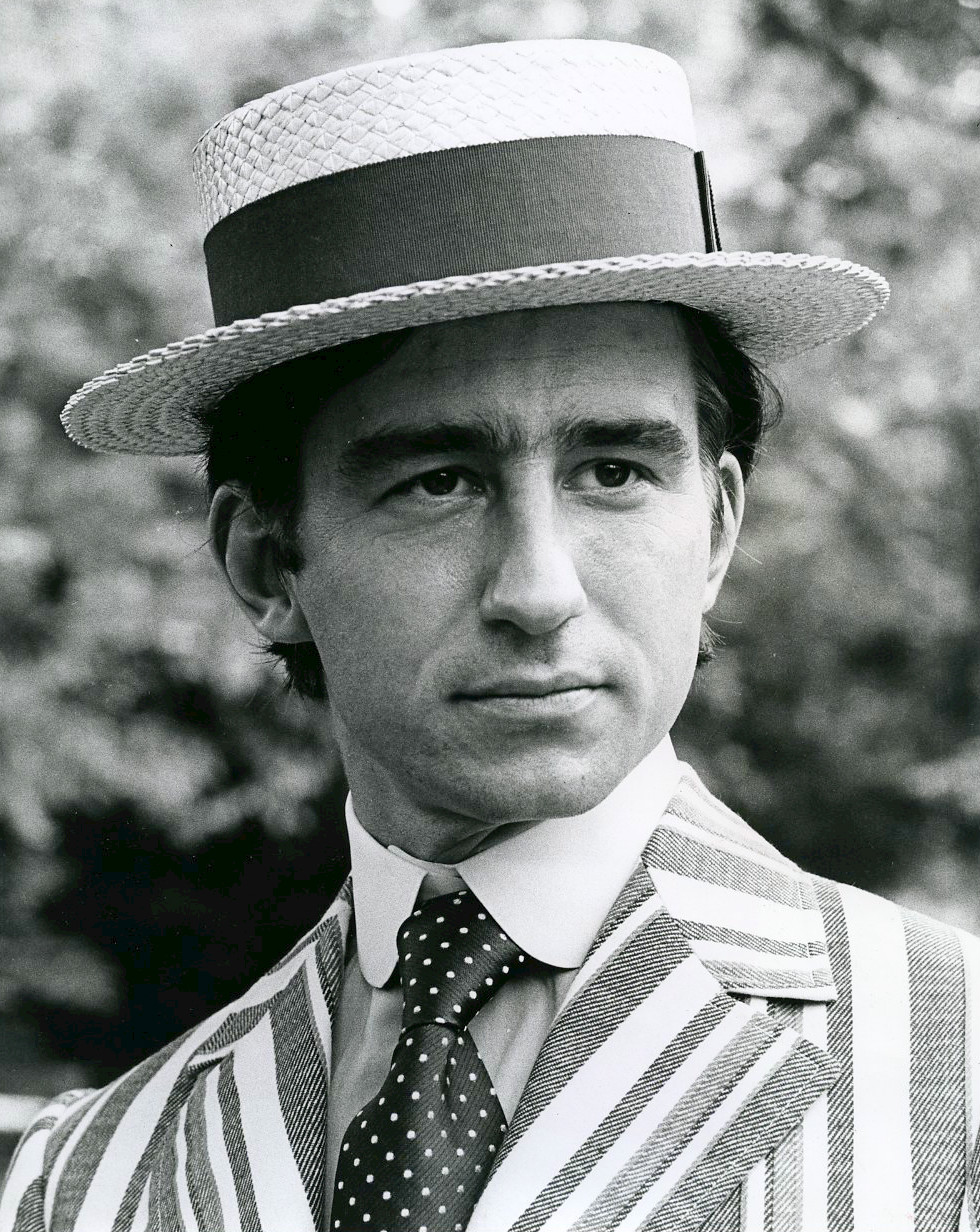
Waterston with the American Shakespeare Festival in 1972

The classically trained Waterston has numerous stage credits to his name. In 1962, he made his Broadway debut playing Jonathan in the Arthur Kopit play Oh Dad, Poor Dad, Mamma's Hung You in the Closet and I'm Feelin' So Sad at the Morosco Theatre. The following year, he made his debut at the Delacorte Theatre playing Silvius in a production of William Shakespeare's As You Like It (1963).

He made his film debut in the 1965 drama movie The Plastic Dome of Norma Jean. He returned to Broadway playing David in First One Asleep, Whistle (1966), and Robert in the Peter Ustinov play Halfway Up the Tree (1967). On October 13, 1969, he starred in Arthur Kopit's play Indians on Broadway at the Brooks Atkinson Theatre. The play was directed by Gene Frankel, and he acted alongside Stacy Keach as Buffalo Bill, Manu Tupou as Sitting Bull, and other actors such as Tom Aldredge, Kevin Conway, Charles Durning, and Raul Julia. The play ran for 96 performances and 16 previews.

During this time, Waterston acted in supporting roles in numerous films including Delbert Mann's romantic comedy Fitzwilly (1967) starring Dick Van Dyke, and the comedy film Generation (1969). He had a leading role in the British romantic drama Three acting opposite Charlotte Rampling and Robie Porter. He acted in the Merchant Ivory film Savages based loosely on the Luis Buñuel film The Exterminating Angel (1962). Waterston continued acting in plays at the Public Theatre including portraying Benedick in Joseph Papp's production of William Shakespeare's Much Ado About Nothing (1972) and played the title role in Hamlet (1975), the former earned him a Drama Desk Award for Outstanding Performance.

=== 1974–1993: Rise to prominence ===
Waterston has a history of doing theater work in the summer, often seen acting in such venues as Long Wharf Theatre and the Yale Repertory Theatre in New Haven. In 1973, acting opposite Katharine Hepburn, he played her son in the television drama film The Glass Menagerie (1973), receiving a Primetime Emmy Award nomination for Outstanding Supporting Actor in a Drama Series for his work in the film. He went on to appear as bond salesman Nick Carraway in the 1974 feature film version of The Great Gatsby acting alongside Robert Redford, Mia Farrow, and Bruce Dern. For his performance he earned two Golden Globe nominations: Best Supporting Actor and New Star of the Year.

The following year, Waterston acted in the neo-Western comedy film Rancho Deluxe (1975) starring Jeff Bridges, Elizabeth Ashley, and Harry Dean Stanton. That same year, he acted in the Canadian thriller Journey into Fear with Zero Mostel, Vincent Price and Shelley Winters. In 1976, he acted in the thriller Sweet Revenge opposite Stockard Channing. The following year, he acted in the British-American thriller Capricorn One playing Lieutenant Colonel Peter Willis. The film had an ensemble cast which included Elliott Gould, James Brolin, O. J. Simpson, and Hal Holbrook. Also in 1977, he starred in an Off-Broadway production of William Shakespeare's Measure for Measure as Duke Vincentio alongside Meryl Streep and John Cazale at the Delacorte Theatre.

Waterston made his first collaboration with Woody Allen playing Mike in the drama Interiors (1978) starring Diane Keaton, Geraldine Page, Maureen Stapleton, and E.G. Marshall. The film was a departure from comedy from Allen and received critical acclaim as well as nominations for five Academy Awards. In 1980, he starred in Benefactors alongside Glenn Close, Mary Beth Hurt, and Simon Jones at The Brooks Atkinson Theatre on Broadway. Also in 1980, he portrayed Old West figure Frank Canton in Heaven's Gate and theoretical physicist J. Robert Oppenheimer in the miniseries Oppenheimer (1980) earned him nominations for a BAFTA Award for Best Actor in a Television Series and a Golden Globe Award for Best Actor – Miniseries or Television Film.

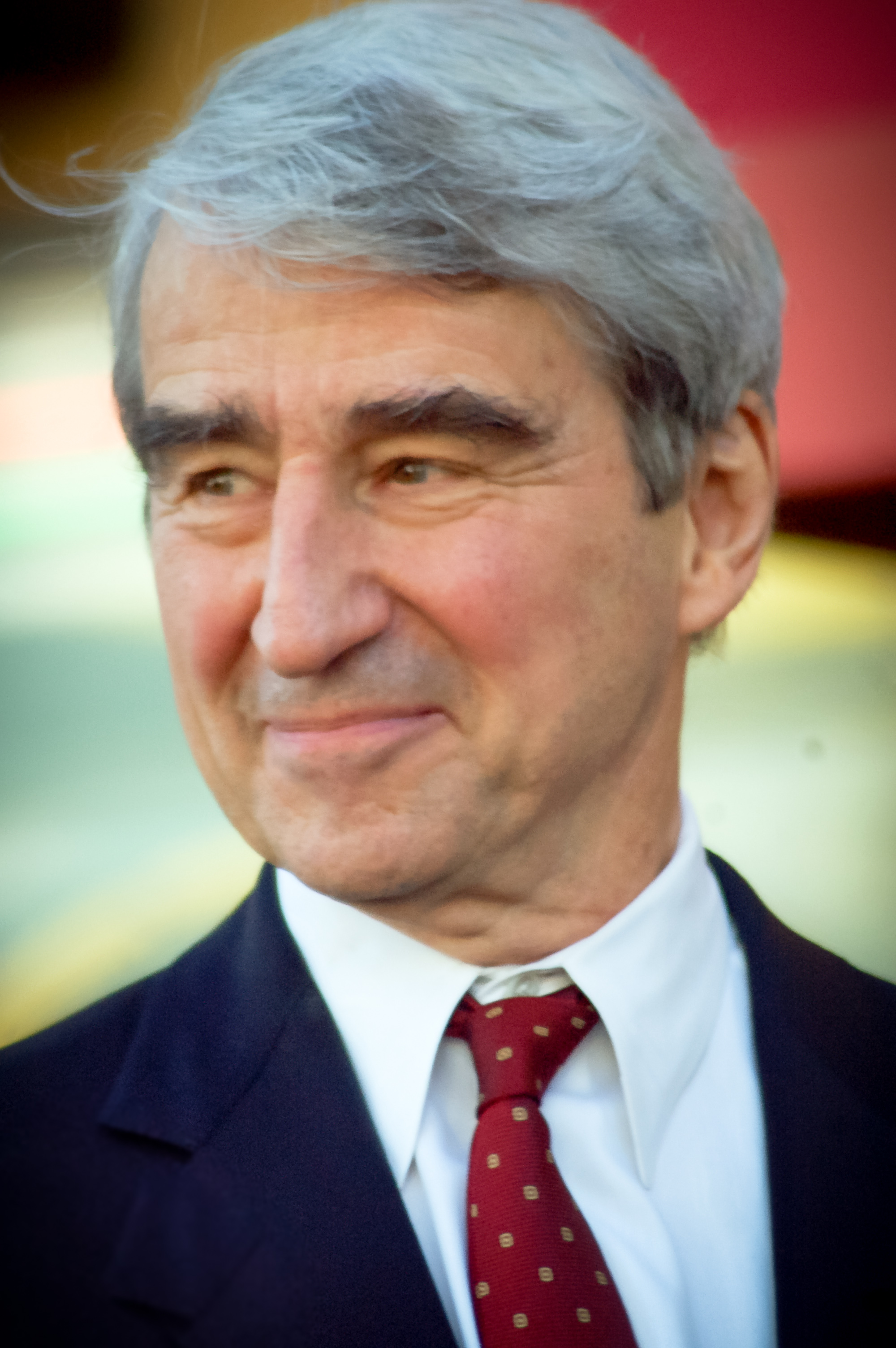
Waterston receiving the star on the Hollywood Walk of Fame in 2010

In 1984, Waterston played American journalist Sydney Schanberg in the British drama The Killing Fields, opposite Haing S. Ngor and John Malkovich. For his performance, Waterston received an Academy Award for Best Actor nomination. Waterston reunited with Woody Allen playing David, a romantic interest for Dianne Wiest and Carrie Fisher in Hannah and Her Sisters (1986), Peter in September (1987), and Ben, a rabbi who is losing his eyesight Crimes and Misdemeanors (1989). He also took a supporting role in the coming of age film The Man in the Moon (1991) starring Reese Witherspoon in her feature film debut, the John Waters satirical black comedy film Serial Mom (1994) and played President Abraham Lincoln in the miniseries Lincoln (1988).

Waterston voiced Lincoln in the 1990 Ken Burns documentary miniseries The Civil War. Waterston portrayed a district attorney in the drama television series I'll Fly Away (1991–93), winning the Golden Globe Award for Best Actor – Television Series Drama. In 1993, he portrayed Abraham Lincoln onstage in Abe Lincoln in Illinois and received Tony Award, Drama Desk Award, and Outer Critics Circle Award nominations for his performance.

=== 1994–2010: Law and Order and acclaim ===
In 1994, Waterston debuted as Executive Assistant District Attorney Jack McCoy in the fifth season of the NBC television series Law & Order created by Dick Wolf. He played the role of John James "Jack" McCoy, who would eventually become Manhattan District Attorney, through the series finale in 2010. The role won him a Screen Actors Guild Award for Outstanding Performance by a Male Actor in a Drama Series, as well as several Emmy and Golden Globe nominations. Upon the show's cancellation, Waterston was the second longest-serving cast member (behind S. Epatha Merkerson), having reprised his role through 16 seasons. He has also made guest appearances as McCoy on other crime shows, such as Homicide: Life on the Street (1997, 99), Exiled: A Law & Order Movie (1998), and spin-offs Law & Order: Special Victims Unit (2000, 07, 10, 18) and Law & Order: Trial by Jury (2005). Due to the success of the New York–based TV series, Waterston and his fellow longtime Law & Order castmate Jerry Orbach were declared "Living Landmarks" by the New York Landmarks Conservancy.

Waterston has appeared as a celebrity contestant on Jeopardy! twice. He made a popular cameo appearance on a 1995 episode of Saturday Night Live as himself, extolling the virtues of Old Glory Insurance, meant to protect the elderly from robot attacks. During this time, he portrayed Richard Helms in Oliver Stone's political drama Nixon (1995) but his scenes were ultimately cut and remain in the Director's cut version of the film. The following year, he reunited with Merchant Ivory for The Proprietor (1996) starring Jeanne Moreau. He portrayed a fictional president of the United States in the thriller Shadow Conspiracy starring Charlie Sheen and Donald Sutherland. He acted in his third Merchant Ivory film Le Divorce (2003) starring Kate Hudson and Naomi Watts.

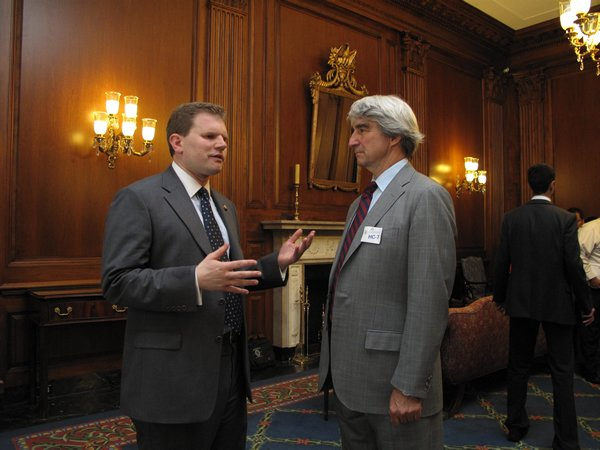
U.S. Representative Dan Maffei and Waterston

Waterston appeared as Polonius in the 2008 Shakespeare in the Park production of Hamlet. His performance received a positive review in The New York Times. On February 12, 2009, Waterston portrayed Abraham Lincoln in Earl Robinson's "The Lonesome Train: A Music Legend for Actors, Folk Singers, Choirs, and Orchestra" at the Riverside Church in New York City. The concert was performed to celebrate Lincoln's 200th birthday.

=== 2011–present: Established actor ===
Waterston has had several other high profile television roles, including his portrayal of cable news president Charlie Skinner in The Newsroom, an HBO series by Aaron Sorkin. Waterston acted opposite Jeff Daniels, Emily Mortimer, Dev Patel, Olivia Munn, and Jane Fonda in the series, which ran from 2012 to 2014. In 2015, Waterston appeared as Prospero in a Shakespeare in the Park production of The Tempest, directed by Michael Greif. In 2015, Waterston joined the cast of the Netflix series Grace and Frankie, starring with Martin Sheen, Jane Fonda and Lily Tomlin. In an interview with the New York Daily News, Waterston supported Tomlin and Fonda in demanding higher salaries than the supporting actors, saying, "I think they're being cheated." His character Sol appeared on all seven seasons of the show, which concluded in 2022.

In 2017, Waterston played Marshal John Cook in the Netflix western limited series Godless opposite Jeff Daniels and Michelle Dockery. Waterston subsequently portrayed George DuPont in the political thriller Miss Sloane starring Jessica Chastain and played Erwin Griswold in the biographical drama On the Basis of Sex starring Felicity Jones as Ruth Bader Ginsburg. In 2021, Waterston was cast in the revival of Law & Order, reprising his role as District Attorney Jack McCoy. He appeared on The Late Show with Stephen Colbert to promote the show. In 2022, he portrayed George Shultz in the Hulu limited series The Dropout starring Amanda Seyfried as Elizabeth Holmes.

On February 2, 2024, Waterston left Law & Order after 20 seasons, with his character Jack McCoy, whom he had played for 405 episodes, being replaced by a new D.A. portrayed by Tony Goldwyn.

== Personal life ==
=== Marriage and family ===
Waterston displaying gifts from fans

Waterston married his first wife, Barbara Johns, in 1964. The couple had one son, actor James Waterston, before divorcing in 1975. Waterston married his second wife, former model Lynn Louisa Woodruff, in 1976. They have three children, including Katherine Waterston.

=== Activism ===
Waterston is a board member of Oceana. Waterston received the Goodermote Humanitarian Award from the Johns Hopkins Bloomberg School of Public Health in 2012 for his longtime support of refugees around the world. Waterston is a longtime friend and fan of the Mark Morris Dance Group and hosted the television presentation of Mozart Dances on PBS's Live from Lincoln Center on August 16, 2007.

Waterston is a practicing Episcopalian. He served as president of the Episcopal Actors Guild from 2002 to 2004.

=== Political activism ===
He was a spokesman for the Unity08 movement, which unsuccessfully sought to run a non- or bipartisan presidential ticket in the 2008 presidential election. Waterston stated in 2007 that he had been a Democrat until leaving the party in disgust following the airing of Lyndon B. Johnson's "Daisy" election advertisement in 1964. However, he endorsed Democratic president Barack Obama for re-election in 2012. As of 2016, Waterston is a registered Democrat. On October 18, 2019, Waterston was arrested outside the U.S. Capitol in Washington, D.C., with Grace and Frankie co-star Jane Fonda, for protesting the Trump administration's policies concerning climate change.

== Awards and honors ==
Waterston received an Academy Award nomination for Best Actor for his performance in The Killing Fields (1984), losing to F. Murray Abraham for his role in Amadeus (1984). Waterston also received three Primetime Emmy Award nominations and two Golden Globe Award nominations for I'll Fly Away, winning a Golden Globe in 1994. He received a 1994 Tony Award nomination for Best Actor in a Play for his performance in the Broadway revival of Abe Lincoln in Illinois. For his portrayal of Jack McCoy in Law & Order, Waterston has received three Primetime Emmy Award nominations and a Golden Globe Award nomination; in addition, he has received 11 Screen Actors Guild Award nominations for his work on Law & Order, winning the Screen Actors Guild Award for Outstanding Performance by a Male Actor in a Drama Series in 1999.

In 2003, Waterston received The Lincoln Forum's Richard Nelson Current Award of Achievement. AllMovie historian Hal Erickson characterized Waterston as having "cultivated a loyal following with his quietly charismatic, unfailingly solid performances."

On January 7, 2010, Waterston received the 2,397th star on the Hollywood Walk of Fame. In 2012, he was inducted into the American Theatre Hall of Fame.

In 2022, the Japanese composer Eiko Ishibashi pays tribute to him in her album 'For McCoy' for his portrayal of the prosecutor Jack McCoy in the TV series Law & Order.

On May 27, 2024, Waterston was inducted as an honorary class member of Princeton University.
