= Tommie Manderson =

English make-up artist

Tommie Manderson (13 September 1912 – 28 January 2015) was an English make-up artist. She was the head of make-up at the BBC from the late 1950s to the early 1960s, during which time she worked on numerous television dramas, including An Age of Kings, A for Andromeda, and the 1963 adaptation of Hedda Gabler starring Ingrid Bergman. She was also noted for preparing Queen Elizabeth II for the first televised Royal Christmas Message in 1957.

Manderson later served as make-up supervisor on a number of theatrical films, including Ridley Scott's Alien, Bill Forsyth's Local Hero, Roland Joffé's The Killing Fields and The Mission, Euzhan Palcy's A Dry White Season, and Jim Sheridan's The Field. She also did make-up on films such as John Cassavetes' Husbands, Alan Parker's Bugsy Malone, James Ivory's Quartet, and Ron Howard's Willow. She received BAFTA Award nominations for her work on The Killing Fields and the 1987 mini-series adaptation of Porterhouse Blue. She also received a Special Achievement Award from the London Critics' Circle Film Awards in 1988.
