= Eva Sereny =

Swiss photographer (1935–2021)

- Born: Zurich, Switzerland
- Died: May 25, 2021
- Occupations: Photographer and film director

Eva Sereny (19 May 1935 - 25 May 2021) was a still photographer and award-winning film director.

== Professional life ==
In 1966, Sereny began teaching herself to be a professional photographer after her husband was in a nearly fatal automobile accident. A friend on the Italian Olympic Committee hired her to document some of the sports facilities being developed to support Italy's athletes. Having received positive feedback at home, she decided to test how good they were by taking them and herself to The Times in London. They were published, a film publicist she knew back in Rome helped her get access for two weeks on the set of Mike Nichols’ Catch-22 (1970), and her career was launched.

Over the next three decades she worked on hundreds of sets. Among them were some of the most notable films of the 1970s and 1980s, including director Jack Clayton's version of The Great Gatsby starring Robert Redford and Mia Farrow, Bertolucci's 1900 starring Robert De Niro, Indiana Jones and the Last Crusade starring Sean Connery and Harrison Ford, and The Night Porter starring Charlotte Rampling.

She photographed a range of actors and public figures, and her work was published in several international fashion, lifestyle, and news magazines, including The Sunday Times Magazine, Observer Magazine, Vogue, Elle, Paris Match, Harpers Bazaar, Time, and Newsweek. Her photographic archive, managed by Iconic Images, includes portraits of numerous international celebrities, including Jacqueline Bisset, Paul Newman, Romy Schneider, Marlon Brando, Raquel Welch, Audrey Hepburn, Clint Eastwood, Luciano Pavarotti, Anthony Quinn, Donald Sutherland, Michelle Pfeiffer, Meryl Streep, and Dustin Hoffman.

The combination of celebrity subjects and wide distribution internationally has made many of her images iconic. Her skill, on the one hand, and her friendship with many of these celebrities, meant that she was also able to get spontaneous shots, including a notable one, taken shortly before Richard Burton and Elizabeth Taylor divorced, that captures their feelings at the time. It was the first film she was hired to work on; she was there, she told The Guardian, "to do ad hoc background shots, capturing rehearsals and that kind of thing," and she "had to be a fly on the wall. I’d hide behind people and avoid wearing bright colours, so as to pass unnoticed."

Sereny worked on four films starring Jacqueline Bisset, who has fond memories of her. "She was refined in a very feminine way, and enjoyed her work,” and they became friends even though Sereny could also be bossy. “She could be argumentative and she could make me laugh."

Sereny acknowledged being influenced by the cinematographers and directors she worked with on set, including Bresson, Bertolucci, Fellini, Truffaut, Pollack, Nichols, Herzog, and Spielberg. Her films include The Dress (1984), a short British film featuring Michael Palin for which she won a BAFTA; and Foreign Student (1994), a feature-length American production starring Robin Givens.

Sereny also directed commercials, but in her 40s she found herself being passed over for less experienced men and was told by a Hollywood agency that being an older woman was an obstacle.

She stopped working as a professional photographer in 2004.

In 2018 Sereny published Through Her Lens: The Stories Behind the Photography of Eva Sereny, a collection of nearly 100 photos complemented by Sereny's stories of their origins, with an introduction by Bisset and Rampling. In conjunction with this publication an exhibition of her portraits was held at a London art gallery.

== Family ==
Eva Sereny, whose parents were Hungarian, was born in Zurich, Switzerland. At different times in her life, she lived in London (where she died), Rome, and Sydney.

Her father, Richard, was a chemist, and her mother, Eva, was an actress. The outbreak of WWII found her father on business in England, where he remained, stranded, to be joined by his wife and daughter. After the war, Eva Sereny's mother opened a flower shop in London.

At the age of 20, Eva Sereny moved to Italy. There she married Vincio Delleani, an engineer, and they had two sons, Riccardo and Alessandro.

She died on 25 May 2021, following complications after a stroke.
