= Alive in the Killing Fields =

2009 memoir by Nawuth Keat

Alive in the Killing Fields is the memoir of Nawuth Keat, a survivor of the Khmer Rouge genocide in Cambodia. The book was published in 2009 by National Geographic.

== Synopsis ==
Nawuth Keat was the fifth of eight children in a Cambodian village known as Salatrave. His father was a prosperous rice farmer, owning both a motorcycle and a tractor. This wealth places Nawuth and his family in particular danger from the Khmer Rouge.

After the dictator Pol Pot overruns the government with the aid of the Khmer Rouge, Nawuth's life is completely transformed. Without warning, Salatrave is attacked and Nawuth's mother, grandmother, sister, aunt, and uncle are massacred. Nawuth himself is shot three times. Nawuth survives his attack and is sent by his father to live in the city of Battambang with his older sister, Chantha. Nawuth's father remains in Salatrave.

Eventually, the Khmer Rouge invade Battambang and Nawuth is forced to flee with his brothers (Hackly, Bunna, and Chanty), Chantha, and Chantha's fiancé (Van Lan). They return to the ruins of Salatrave, where Chantha and Van Lan are soon married.

Nawuth's father flees to the jungle to escape certain death, while Nawuth and the rest of the family are forced into labour by the Khmer Rouge. Food is scarce and they suffer from malnutrition. The family is further separated when Bunna is forced to join a chat, a team of teenagers forced to build dams and huts. Nawuth eventually escapes from the labour camp and joins his father in the jungle, where he stays for many months. While in the Jungle, Nawuth is forced to eat monkeys, turtles, snakes, and whatever other animals he can kill.

Nawuth later rejoins Van Lan, only to find nothing has changed for the better. There is less food and the murders have gotten worse. At this time Nawuth witnesses an old man's murder and realizes how truly evil the Khmer Rouge are. After some time back, food is too scarce to survive. During that year, more people died from starvation than from bullets. Then one morning, Van Lan left to visit his parents. During this time, Nawuth stole some rice from neighbouring farms. He also stole squash and made traps for fish.

Nawuth and his brothers suffer from starvation and their bellies become bloated. Due to this, he and his brother, Chanty, go back to the neighbouring farms to steal more rice, and they are caught. The Khmer Rouge let them go. Due to a lack of food, Nawuth gets infected. Most people have died from this infection, so Van Lan takes him to a doctor, and the doctor saves his life by giving Nawuth an enema. Afterwards, Nawuth is told to guard a large building filled with corn. Monkeys steal the corn, and Nawuth is yelled at by the soldier who assigned him the task. He survives and once again guards the corn. Using traps his father taught him how to make, he catches a few monkeys that try to steal the corn and eats them. Afterward, he takes some of the corn and hides in the jungle; and he is caught, but his life is spared. The weeks that followed were harsh: people blamed stolen food products on him, but the guards did not believe them. A while later, his father was killed.

Some time passed before the world gave any help. The Vietnamese started to attack the Khmer Rouge and a war started.

The Vietnamese began to attack the cities. Chantha gave birth to a baby named Vibol during this time. Nawuth is caught in the crossfire shortly after. It was a small skirmish, but many people were injured. They did not get away though: the Khmer Rouge made them march further inland, away from the Vietnamese-protected zones. A few weeks later, they left the Khmer Rouge area for the city. About thirty people left with them at night. They ate what they could. When they finally got to the cities, they met up with Van Lan's family. When there, Nawuth met a child named Ang. They became best friends. The Vietnamese were "an improvement" over the Khmer Rouge, but they were still ruthless. Along in the city, Nawuth got his palm read, and it turned out to be an accurate statement. During this time, Van Lan had a talk with Nawuth about leaving. The Vietnamese have taken what the Khmer Rouge have not destroyed. A few days later they say goodbye and leave. They walked more than they had ever. The Vietnamese did not want the world to know that they were not saviours, so they classified the wanderers as enemies. They had to drink from a pond with dead bodies in it, and the Khmer Rouge changed their names to Angka, or "The Organization of Saviors". Finally, they slipped across the border to sneak into a Thai refugee camp, where life was almost as bad: it was run by the United Nations. They got one chicken every two weeks and a bag of rice a month. Some of the Thai refugee camps would deport thousands of refugees back into Cambodia. The Cambodians shot the old and the weak, and the people in the front were killed by landmines. The United Nations got involved.

Chantha gave a woman one hundred dollars' worth of gold, and Nawuth split up with his family and friends. The woman took him in, only to treat him like trash. The family that Nawuth is staying with has a sponsor in Paris, who is willing to pay for the airplane trip. Nawuth is supposed to meet Van Lan and the rest of his family in Paris. Nawuth and his "family" leave to go to another camp. There, they got a chicken a week, but Nawuth would steal religious offerings given to Buddhist monks anyway. A few weeks later, his "mom" tells him they aren't going to Paris after all: their sponsor had been unable to buy the tickets, but instead, there would be a chance they would be able to go to the United States. They had a sponsor in the United States, but they had to wait an entire year to go. When they were allowed to leave, they got medical examinations, but the doctor misread the bullet wound on Nawuth's arm as an infection and pronounced Nawuth to be sick. They had to stay. The family shunned Nawuth. Over the following months, the doctor was convinced that the scars on Nawuth were not infections, so he signed the papers for qualification. They were moved to another camp.

This camp was more crowded than the others. They spent two weeks there, and then they got sponsored and were told: "In two days, you leave for the United States". There, the bus that took him was larger than any bus he had ever seen, and the actual airport was the same, the largest building he had ever seen. They landed in San Francisco, and after nine years of suffering, Nawuth was free.

== Afterword ==
Shortly after, Nawuth left for Portland, Oregon. This is where he would split up with the family. This was because he was forced to work, while the other kids got to play. He got a job, being paid $3.17 an hour, and a monthly welfare check of $300, which he gave to his "mom". When he found out that Van Lan, Chantha, Vibol, and Bunna lived in a refugee camp in Indonesia, he asked "mom" for ten dollars. She refused. He left to go and live with his great-aunt who lived not too far away from Portland. He later married his high school sweetheart, Rany Prak, who was also a Cambodian immigrant. They had three children: Brian, Anthony, and Stephanie. Van Lan, Chantha, Vibol, and Bunna all live in Lyon, France. Ang also made it to France. Hackly lives with Nawuth, and Nawuth's oldest sister Chanya, and works in a military hospital in Pursat.
