= Jon Swain =

British journalist (born 1948)

Jon Anketell Brewer Swain (born 1948) is a British journalist and writer.

Swain's book River of Time: A Memoir of Vietnam chronicles his experiences from 1970 to 1975 during the Vietnam War, including the fall of Cambodia.

== Early life ==
Swain was born in London in 1948 and is of English, Scots, Irish, French, and Spanish descent. After an unhappy education at the independent Blundell's School, from which he was expelled, he ran away to join the French Foreign Legion.

== Career ==
For many years, Swain was The Sunday Times' correspondent in Paris. During this time he had many famous scoops, including uncovering the financial support extended by Libya's Colonel Gaddafi to Arthur Scargill's National Union of Mineworkers.

He also reported for the newspaper from East Timor in 1999, at the time of its vote for independence. This period saw widespread violence by Indonesian-backed militias and by the Indonesian military itself, as Swain experienced first-hand. On the road to Becora, just east of Dili, together with American photographer Chip Hires and their Timorese driver and interpreter, Swain encountered, and was detained by, Indonesian soldiers of Battalion 745. In the same district, only a couple of hours later, these same soldiers would kill Dutch-born Financial Times journalist Sander Thoenes and attempt to kill his driver. The soldiers immediately abducted Swain's interpreter, rifle-butted the driver and gouged out an eye, and were looking for a discreet location to kill the two journalists and the driver. These three decided to escape, under fire, and hid in the bush. They then called The Sunday Times office in London on a mobile phone and The Times alerted the Australian forces in nearby Dili. Swain and Hires were rescued by helicopter. They located driver Sancho Ramos soon afterwards and were able to persuade the Australians to fly him to Darwin for immediate medical attention. The interpreter, Anacleto da Silva, has never been seen since. Swain has recounted the incident in print, and in a television interview for fellow journalist Step Vaessen, who was reporting from central Dili with her cameraman spouse, André.

Swain was portrayed by Julian Sands in the film The Killing Fields (1984).
