= Dith Pran =

Cambodian-American photojournalist (1942–2008)

- ឌិត ប្រន
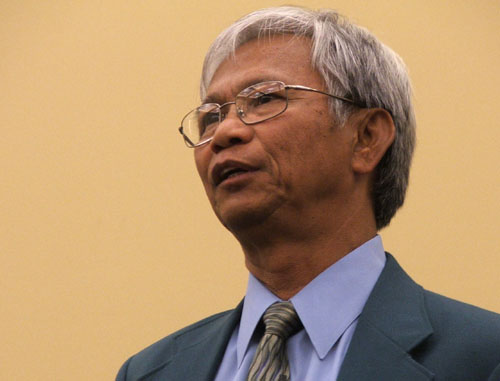
- Dith in 2007
- Born: September 27, 1942; Siem Reap, Cambodia, French Indochina
- Died: March 30, 2008 (aged 65); New Brunswick, New Jersey, U.S.
- Citizenship: Cambodia (until 1986); U.S. (from 1986)
- Occupation: Photojournalist
- Employer: The New York Times
- Children: 4

Dith Pran (Note: Khmer: ឌិត ប្រន, romanized: Dĭt Prân, pronounced [ɗɨt prɑːn]) (September 27, 1942 – March 30, 2008) was a Cambodian-American photojournalist. He was a refugee and survivor of the Cambodian genocide and one of the subjects of the Academy Award–winning film The Killing Fields (1984), in which he was portrayed by Haing S. Ngor, a fellow survivor.

== Early life ==
Dith was born in Siem Reap, Cambodia. His father worked as a public works official. He learned French at school and taught himself English.

The United States Army hired him as a translator but after his ties with the United States were severed, Dith worked with a British film crew for the film Lord Jim.

== Cambodian genocide ==
In 1975, Dith and New York Times reporter Sydney Schanberg stayed behind in Cambodia to cover the fall of the capital Phnom Penh to the Communist Khmer Rouge. Schanberg and other foreign reporters were allowed to leave the country, but Dith was not. Due to the persecution of intellectuals during the genocide, he hid the fact that he was educated or that he knew Americans, and pretended that he had been a taxi driver. When Cambodians were forced to work in labour camps, Dith had to endure four years of starvation and torture before Vietnam overthrew the Khmer Rouge on January 7, 1979. He coined the phrase "killing fields" to refer to the clusters of corpses and skeletal remains of victims he encountered during his 40-mile (60 km) escape. His three brothers and one sister were killed in Cambodia.

Dith returned to Siem Reap where he learned that 50 members of his family had died. The Vietnamese had made him village chief, but he feared they would discover his US ties, and he escaped to Thailand on October 3, 1979.

== Career in the United States ==
After Schanberg learned that Dith had made it to Thailand, he flew halfway around the world, and they had a joyful reunion there. Schanberg brought Dith back to the United States to reunite him with his family, and in 1980 Dith joined his paper, The New York Times, where he worked as a photojournalist. He gained worldwide recognition after the 1984 release of the film The Killing Fields about his experiences under the Khmer Rouge. He was portrayed in the film by first-time actor and fellow survivor Haing S. Ngor (1940–1996), who won an Academy Award for Best Supporting Actor for his performance. He was a recipient of an Ellis Island Medal of Honor in 1998 and the Award of Excellence of the International Center.

Dith campaigned for recognition of the Cambodian genocide victims, especially as founder and president of the Dith Pran Holocaust Awareness Project. The organization was founded in 1994. In addition to its main mission, it keeps photographic records to help Cambodians who are searching for missing family members. Dith Pran headed the organization until his death in 2008, when his widow Kim DePaul assumed that position.

== Personal life ==
In 1986, he became a U.S. citizen with his then-wife Ser Moeun Dith, whom he later divorced. He then married Kim DePaul but they also divorced.

== Death ==
On March 30, 2008, Dith died, aged 65, in New Brunswick, New Jersey, having been diagnosed with pancreatic cancer three months earlier. He was living in Woodbridge, New Jersey.

== Works ==
- Pran, Dith; DePaul, Kim (1997). Children of Cambodia's Killing Fields. Yale University Press. ISBN 0300078730.
