= Sydney Schanberg =

American journalist

- Born: Sydney Hillel Schanberg; January 17, 1934; Clinton, Massachusetts, U.S.
- Died: July 9, 2016 (aged 82); Poughkeepsie, New York, U.S.
- Education: Harvard University (AB)
- Occupation: Journalist
- Spouse: Janice Leah Sakofsky (1967–1976, divorced) Jane Freiman (1995–2016, his death)
- Children: Jessica and Rebecca

Sydney Hillel Schanberg (January 17, 1934 – July 9, 2016) was an American journalist who was best known for his coverage of the war in Cambodia. He was the recipient of a Pulitzer Prize, two George Polk awards, two Overseas Press Club awards, and the Sigma Delta Chi prize for distinguished journalism. Schanberg was portrayed by Sam Waterston in the 1984 film The Killing Fields based on the experiences of Schanberg and the Cambodian journalist Dith Pran in Cambodia.

== Early life and career ==
Sydney Schanberg was born to a Jewish family in Clinton, Massachusetts, the son of Freda (Feinberg) and Louis Schanberg, a grocery store owner. He studied at Clinton High School in 1951 before receiving a B.A. in Government from Harvard University in 1955. After initially enrolling at Harvard Law School, he requested to be moved up the draft list and undertook basic military training at Fort Hood in Texas.

Schanberg joined The New York Times as a journalist in 1959. He spent much of the early 1970s in Southeast Asia as a correspondent for the Times. For his reporting, he won the George Polk Award for excellence in journalism twice, in 1971 and 1974. In 1971, he wrote about the Pakistani genocide in then-East Pakistan (now Bangladesh) as New Delhi bureau chief (1969–1973). Upon becoming Southeast Asia correspondent (1973–1975), he covered the Vietnam War and the resulting Cambodian Civil War.

Like many foreign observers during the Cambodian Civil War, Schanberg underestimated the extremism of the Khmer Rouge and the danger posed by their movement. Following years of combat, Schanberg wrote in The New York Times about the departure of the Americans and the coming regime change, writing about the Cambodians that "it is difficult to imagine how their lives could be anything but better with the Americans gone." A dispatch he wrote on April 13, 1975, written from Phnom Penh, ran with the headline "Indochina without Americans: for most, a better life."

Writing about his experiences following the Khmer Rouge takeover, Schanberg acknowledged that "I watched many Cambodian friends being herded out of Phnom Penh. Most of them I never saw again. All of us felt like betrayers, like people who were protected and didn't do enough to save our friends. We felt shame. We still do.", and utterly condemned the "maniacal Khmer Rouge guerrillas". He was one of the few American journalists to remain behind in Phnom Penh after the city fell. He and his assistant were threatened with death, and took sanctuary in the French embassy. Two weeks later, he left by truck for Thailand.

== Later career ==
Schanberg won the 1976 Pulitzer Prize for International Reporting for his Cambodia coverage. The citation reads, "For his coverage of the Communist takeover in Cambodia, carried out at great risk when he elected to stay at his post after the fall of Phnom Penh." His 1980 book The Death and Life of Dith Pran was about the struggle for survival of his colleague Dith Pran in the Khmer Rouge regime. The book inspired the 1984 film The Killing Fields in which Schanberg was played by Sam Waterston.

Schanberg served as the Times metropolitan editor (1977–1980) before joining the editorial pages as a columnist specializing in the New York metropolitan area in 1981. Although he was initially considered to be a leading candidate to succeed executive editor A.M. Rosenthal after receiving his Pulitzer Prize, their relationship was soon strained by Schanberg's innovative approach to local coverage (including a proposed 1977 series on upper middle class gay professionals that was ultimately suppressed by Rosenthal) and increasingly vitriolic critiques of New York's real estate industry. In September 1985, Schanberg's column was cancelled by Rosenthal after he criticized the paper's coverage of the Westway highway development. He refused a proposed writer-at-large post at The New York Times Magazine and resigned from the Times.

Between 1986 and 1995, Schanberg was an associate editor and columnist for Newsday. He covered the Senate's United States Senate Select Committee on POW/MIA Affairs hearings and became engrossed in the Vietnam War POW/MIA issue. Writing for Penthouse, The Village Voice and The Nation, Schanberg became a leading advocate of the "live prisoners left behind" conspiracy theory in that matter. He published many articles on the subject and outlined reasons why no POWs were ever found, alleging that government officials never seriously investigated reports of live POWs due to fear of public outrage, and to save embarrassment and prevent damage to their reputations and careers. He further said in his articles that the Vietnamese never admitted to holding prisoners in order to be accepted by the international community, and that they had initially tried to ransom them for reparations once the war ended.

In 1992, Schanberg received the Elijah Parish Lovejoy Award as well as an honorary Doctor of Laws degree from Colby College. After leaving Newsday, he worked as head of investigations for APBNews.com, shepherding the fledgling digital publication to a 1999 Investigative Reporters and Editors award. He settled in exurban New Paltz, New York after serving as the inaugural James H. Ottaway Sr. Visiting Professor of Journalism at the State University of New York at New Paltz in 2001.

In 2006, Schanberg resigned from The Village Voice (where he had served as a staff writer and Press Clips columnist since 2002) in protest over the editorial, political and personnel changes made by the new publisher, New Times Media.

In the July 1, 2010, issue of American Conservative, Schanberg wrote an article about his struggle to advance his position that the United States government left behind hundreds of POWs being held by North Vietnam at the end of the Vietnam War.

Schanberg died on July 9, 2016, after suffering a heart attack in the previous week.

== Bibliography ==
- Schanberg, Sydney (1980). The Death and Life of Dith Pran. Penguin. ISBN 0-14-008457-6.
- Schanberg, Sydney (1984). The Killing Fields: The Facts Behind The Film. London: Weidenfeld and Nicolson. ISBN 0297785370.
- Schanberg, Sydney (2010). Beyond the Killing Fields. Potomac Books. ISBN 978-1-59797-505-6.
