= Paul Cemmick =

British artist and cartoonist

Paul Cemmick is a cartoonist and caricaturist whose designs and work have been seen in many different media, most prominently animation, (British) comics and book covers. According to the website ChildrensIllustrators.com, Cemmick "started drawing cartoons as a child by copying Popeye, Tom and Jerry and Yogi Bear from his gran's TV."

== Books ==
=== Maid Marian and Her Merry Men ===
Arguably his best-known credit is for the well-loved BBC children's series Maid Marian and Her Merry Men, for which he provided the artwork for the famous closing credits. Concurrent with the series' run during 1989–1993, Mr Cemmick illustrated eight comics adapted from the programme's scripts by series creator and lead writer Tony Robinson. In 2006-2007 he produced four all-new mini-comics which were included in each of the four series DVD releases from Eureka Entertainment. See Bibliography (below) for details.

=== Covers ===
Mr Cemmick's best-known cover artwork adorns several of the later covers of Tom Holt's comic-fantasy novels, published by Orbit Books in the UK. Mr Cemmick was the third regular Holt cover-artist, following in the footsteps of Josh Kirby and Steve Lee. Mr Holt explained the transition from Lee to Cemmick being due to "some sort of falling-out between [Lee] and the Orbit people" after his novel Open Sesame (1997).

== Cartoons ==
Cemmick's cartoons and caricatures appear regularly in the UK sci-fi magazine SFX, and publications including Take a Break magazine. He co-created "N.U.T.S. Investigations" with Spitting Image and 2DTV alumnus Giles Pilbrow for The Sunday Times, and has produced full comicstrip artwork for several BBC magazines, including Girl Talk and It's Hot. These official BBC comicstrips include adaptations of EastEnders, adventures of the Blue Peter pets, and most recently (as an interesting semi-follow-up to his work on MM&HMM), the latest BBC One version of Robin Hood (2006) in 'Robin Hood Adventures' issue 1 (BBC Magazines, 10–23 October 2007). Cemmick is currently producing two comic strips in the weekly BBC publication Match of the Day. As well as a double page comic strip in a new magazine based on the massively successful TV show Top Gear. The magazine is called Top Gear Turbo.

=== Television credits ===
In television, he has worked on Spitting Image as well as Maid Marian and Her Merry Men. He was also one of the designers and three main artists on the ITV television series 2DTV (2001), working on that programme for all of its five series. He more recently designed the logo for the revamped ITV animated series Emu (2007) starring Emu, Rod Hull's famous sidekick.

== Other ==
In his spare time he and Mark Harrison are in a band called "2BC", which produces music of an "Electro/Comedy/Electronica" hue.

=== Bibliography ===
==== Maid Marian and Her Merry Men ====
Written (and adapted) by Tony Robinson, illustrated by Paul Cemmick. Published by the BBC and Penguin Character Books Ltd between 1989 and 1992.

- How the Band got Together (Penguin Character Books/BBC, November 1989) ISBN 0-563-20808-2
- Robert the Incredible Chicken (Penguin Character Books/BBC, November 1989) ISBN 0-563-20809-0
- The Whitish Knight (Penguin Character Books/BBC, October 1990) ISBN 0-563-36040-2
- The Beast of Bolsover (BBC/Penguin Character Books, October 1990) ISBN 0-563-36041-0
- The Worksop Egg Fairy (Penguin Character Books/BBC, October 1991) ISBN 0-563-36220-0
- Rabies in Love (BBC/Penguin Character Books, October 1991) ISBN 0-563-36219-7
- It Came From Outer Space (Penguin Character Books/BBC, November 1992) ISBN 0-563-36709-1
- Driving Ambition and Keeping Mum (Penguin Character Books/BBC, November 1992) ISBN 0-563-36710-5

==== Other illustrations ====
- The Funny Side of Teaching by Stirling Johnstone and Paul Cemmick, with an introduction by Ronnie Corbett (Stevenson Publications Ltd, October 1995) ISBN 0-9526395-0-5
- The "Funday Times" Fantastic Fun Book by Richard Lloyd-Perry and Paul Cemmick (Boxtree) ISBN 1-85283-858-2
- Crocodile by Rachel Ward and Paul Cemmick (Quadrillion Media, LLC, June 1999) ISBN 1-84100-210-0
- Hippo by Rachel Ward and Paul Cemmick (Quadrillion Media, LLC, June 1999) ISBN 1-84100-211-9
- Panda by Rachel Ward and Paul Cemmick (Quadrillion Media, LLC, June 1999) ISBN 1-84100-213-5
- Tiger by Rachel Ward and Paul Cemmick (Quadrillion Media, LLC, June 1999) ISBN 1-84100-212-7
- The Ultimate Scooter Guide by Ben Sharpe and Paul Cemmick (Scholastic, January 2001) ISBN 0-439-28554-2
- Pulp Idol (SFX (2006))
- Choices, choices... by Dawne Allette and Paul Cemmick (Tamarind Books, July 2007) ISBN 1-870516-83-4

==== Covers ====
- Wish You Were Here by Tom Holt, HB (Orbit, 1998) PB (Orbit, 1998) ISBN 1-85723-687-4
- Only Human by Tom Holt HB (Orbit, 1999) PB (Orbit, 2000) ISBN 1-85723-949-0
- Snow White and the Seven Samurai by Tom Holt HB (Orbit, December 1999) ISBN 1-85723-898-2 PB (Orbit, June 2000) ISBN 1-85723-988-1
- Valhalla by Tom Holt HB (Orbit, June 2000) ISBN 1-85723-983-0 PB (Orbit, May 2001) ISBN 1-84149-042-3
- Nothing But Blue Skies by Tom Holt HB (Orbit, May 2001) ISBN 1-84149-040-7 PB (Orbit, 2001)) ISBN 1-84149-058-X
- Falling Sideways by Tom Holt HB (Orbit, 2002) ISBN 1-84149-087-3 PB (Orbit, 2002) ISBN 1-84149-110-1
