= Here Comes the Sun (disambiguation) =

"Here Comes the Sun" is a song by The Beatles.

Here Comes the Sun may also refer to:

- Here Comes the Sun (Holt novel), a science-fiction novel by Tom Holt
- Here Comes the Sun (Dennis-Benn novel), a novel by Nicole Dennis-Benn
- Here Comes the Sun (film), a 1946 British film
- Here Comes the Sun (Nina Simone album), 1971
- Here Comes the Sun (Rachael Leahcar album)
- "Here Comes the Sun" (Sweetbox song)
- Here Comes The Sun (yacht)
- "Here Comes The Sun", a 2021 song by Bill Wurtz
- "Look, Here Comes the Sun", a 1968 charting single by The Sunshine Company
- Here Comes the Sun: A Last Chance for the Climate and a Fresh Chance for Civilization, a 2025 book by environmentalist Bill McKibben
