= Blonde bombshell =

Blonde bombshell may refer to:

- Blonde bombshell (stereotype), a stereotype for women with blonde hair
- Blonde Bombshell (novel), a 2010 novel by Tom Holt
- The Blonde Bombshell, a 1999 two-part miniseries by Robert Bierman, based on the life of actress Diana Dors
- The Blonde Bombshell, a 1961 album by Trisha Noble
- Harlow: The Blonde Bombshell, a 1993 documentary film about Jean Harlow hosted by Sharon Stone
- "Bombshell Blonde", a song by Owl City from the 2012 album The Midsummer Station
- A beer from The Old Cannon Brewery
- The finishing move of professional wrestler Chris Candido, a superbomb

== People ==
- Jean Harlow (1911–1937), American film actress
- Charles Borck (1917–2008), Filipino basketball player
- Evelyn Dall (1918–2010), American singer and actress
- Shelley Winters (1920–2006), American actress
- Merle Keagle (1923–1960), American baseball player
- LaVerne Carter (1925–2012), American professional bowler
- Marilyn Monroe (1926-1962), American film actress
- Mamie Van Doren (born 1931) American actress
- Diana Dors (1931–1984), English actress
- Jayne Mansfield (1933–1967), American actress
- Carl Ditterich (born 1945), Australian footballer
- Ahmad Latiff Khamaruddin (born 1979), Singaporean footballer

== See also ==
- Bombshell (disambiguation)
