= Leo Genn =

English actor (1905–1978)

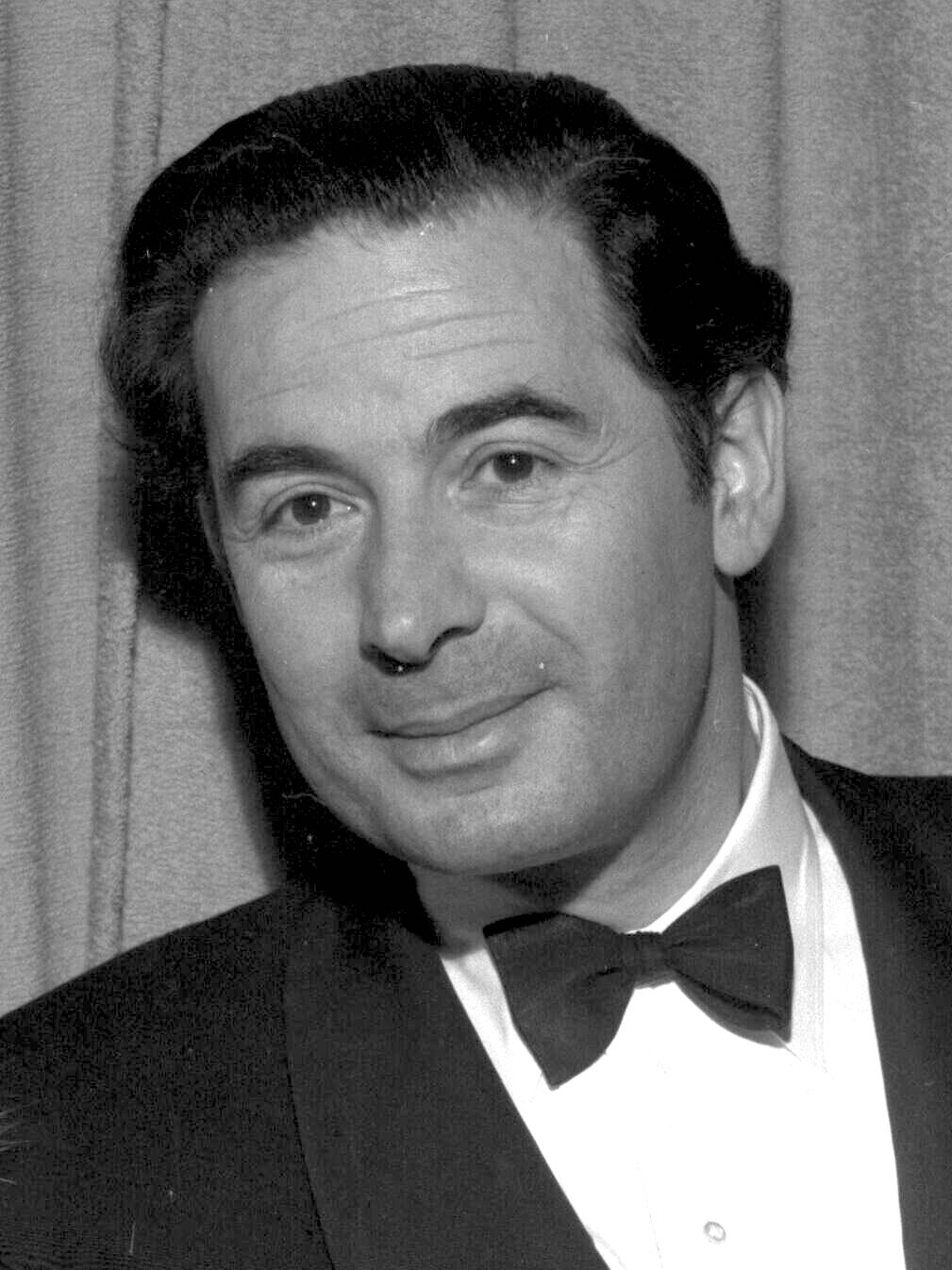
- Genn at the 24th Academy Awards in 1952
- Born: Leopold John Genn; 9 August 1905; Stamford Hill, London, England
- Died: 26 January 1978 (aged 72); London, England
- Education: St Catharine's College, Cambridge
- Occupations: Actor; barrister
- Years active: 1935–1975
- Spouse: Marguerite van Praag (m. 1933)
- Military career
- Allegiance: United Kingdom
- Branch: British Army
- Rank: Lieutenant Colonel
- Units: Royal Artillery
- Conflicts: World War II

Leopold John Genn (/ɡɛn/ GHEN; 9 August 1905 – 26 January 1978) was an English actor and barrister. Distinguished by his relaxed charm and smooth, "black velvet" voice, he had a lengthy career in theatre, film, television and radio, often playing aristocratic or gentlemanly, sophisticated roles.

Born to a Jewish family in London, Genn was educated as a lawyer and was a practising barrister until after World War II, in which he had served in the Royal Artillery as a lieutenant-colonel. He began his acting career at The Old Vic and made his film debut in 1935, starring in a total of 85 screen roles until his death in 1978. For his portrayal of Petronius in the 1951 Hollywood epic Quo Vadis, he received an Oscar nomination for Best Supporting Actor.

== Early life and family ==
Genn was born at 144 Kyverdale Road, Stamford Hill, Hackney, London, the son of Jewish parents Woolfe (William) Genn and Rachel Genn (née Asserson).

Genn attended the City of London School, having gained scholarships in both classics and mathematics, and studied law at St Catharine's College, Cambridge, where he became captain of both the football and tennis teams. He went on to study at the Middle Temple, qualifying as a barrister in 1928. He ceased practising as a lawyer after serving as an assistant prosecutor at the Belsen War Trials.

== Career ==
=== Theatre career ===
Genn entered acting with the Berkley Players (attached to the West London Synagogue) in order to increase his chances of finding prospective clients for his legal work. Actor/manager Leon Lion saw Genn act and offered him a contract. Genn's theatrical debut was in 1930 in A Marriage has been Disarranged at the Devonshire Park Theatre, Eastbourne and then at the Royalty Theatre in Dean Street, London. Lion had engaged him simultaneously as an actor and attorney. In 1933, he appeared in Ballerina by Rodney Ackland. Between September 1934 and March 1936, Leo Genn was a member of the Old Vic Company, where he appeared in many productions of Shakespeare. In 1934 he featured in R. J. Minney's Clive of India.

In 1937, he played Horatio in Tyrone Guthrie's production of Hamlet, with Laurence Olivier as Hamlet, in Elsinore, Denmark. In 1938, Genn appeared in the theatrical hit The Flashing Stream by Charles Langbridge Morgan and went with the show to Broadway in New York City. His many other stage performances included Lillian Hellman's Another Part of the Forest, Twelve Angry Men, The Devil's Advocate, and Somerset Maugham's The Sacred Flame.

In 1959, Genn gave a reading in Chichester Cathedral. In 1974, a recording of The Jungle Book was released with Genn as narrator and Miklós Rózsa conducting the Frankenland Symphony Orchestra with the music from the film.

=== Film career ===
Genn's first film role was as Shylock in Immortal Gentleman (1935), a biography of Shakespeare. Douglas Fairbanks Jr hired Genn as a technical adviser on the film Accused (1936). He was subsequently given a small part in the film on the strength of a "splendid voice and presence". Genn received another small role in Alexander Korda's The Drum (1938) and was the young man who danced with Eliza Doolittle at the duchess's ball in Pygmalion, a film made in the same year, although he was uncredited.

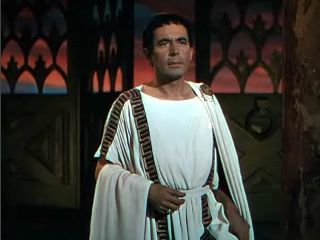
Screenshot of Leo Genn from the trailer for the film Quo Vadis

=== War service ===
With war approaching, Genn joined the Officers' Emergency Reserve in 1938. He was commissioned in the Royal Artillery on 6 July 1940 and was promoted to lieutenant-colonel in 1943. In 1944 the actor was given official leave to appear as Charles I d'Albret, the Constable of France, in Laurence Olivier's Henry V.

Genn was awarded the Croix de Guerre in 1945. He was part of the British unit that investigated war crimes at Belsen concentration camp and later was an assistant prosecutor at the Belsen war crimes trials in Lüneburg, Germany.

=== Post-war ===
He was in Green for Danger (1946) and The Snake Pit (1948). He was one of the two leading actors in The Wooden Horse in 1950. After his Oscar-nominated success as Petronius in Quo Vadis (1951), he appeared in John Huston's Moby Dick (1956). Genn also appeared in some American films, such as The Girls of Pleasure Island, and Plymouth Adventure (1952), a fictionalised treatment of the Pilgrims' landing at Plymouth Rock. He later starred opposite Gene Tierney in the British film Personal Affair (1953).

He played Major Michael Pemberton in Roberto Rossellini's Era Notte a Roma (Escape by Night, 1960). Leo Genn narrated the coronation programmes of both 1937 and 1953, the King George VI Memorial Programme in 1952, and the United Nations ceremonial opening (in the USA) in 1947.

Genn was a governor of the Mermaid Theatre and trustee of the Yvonne Arnaud Theatre. He was also council member of the Arts Educational Trust. He was appointed distinguished visiting professor of theatre arts, Pennsylvania State University, 1968 and visiting professor of drama, University of Utah, 1969.

== Personal life and death ==
On 14 May 1933, Genn married Marguerite van Praag (1908–1978), a casting director at Ealing Studios. They had no children.

Genn died in London on 26 January 1978. The immediate cause of death was a heart attack, brought on by complications of pneumonia. He is buried in Etretat Churchyard, Seine-Maritime, France.

In 2023, a historical marker was placed on the building where he was born by the Jewish American Society for Historic Preservation, U.K. Branch and AJEX.

The text reads:

(Lt Col.) Leo Genn, RA, Croix de Guerre
Jewish Prosecutor - Bergen Belsen War Crimes Trials
Famous actor and soldier (1905–78) was born in this house
"When justice is done, it brings joy to the righteous..." Proverbs 21:15
(Jewish American Society for Historic Preservation, U.K. Branch and AJEX)

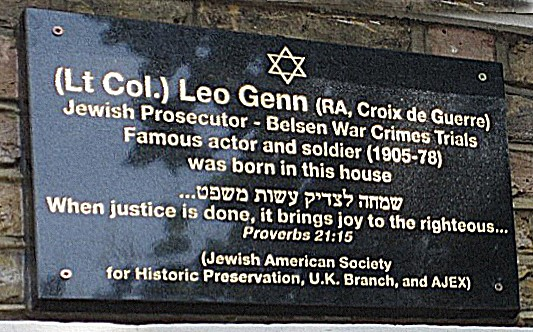
Leo Genn military officer, prosecutor at Belsen War Trials, famous British movie actor.

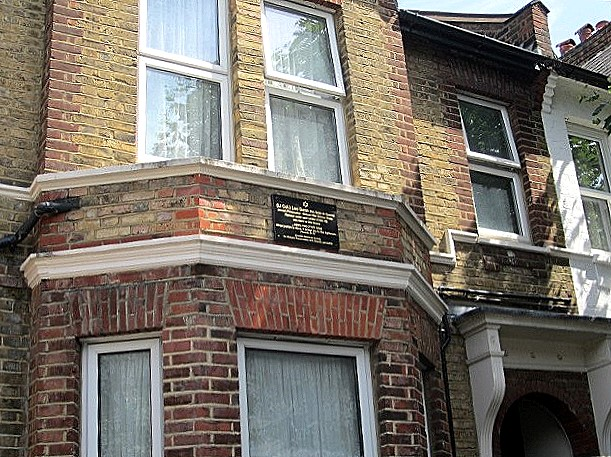
Leo Genn marker on house he was born in.

== Selected filmography ==
- 1935: Immortal Gentleman as Merchant / Shylock
- 1936: The Dream Doctor as Husband
- 1936: Rhodes of Africa as Narrator (voice, uncredited)
- 1936: Accused as Man (uncredited)
- 1937: The Cavalier of the Streets as Attorney General
- 1937: Jump for Glory as Prosecuting Counsel directed by Raoul Walsh
- 1937: The Rat as Defending Counsel
- 1938: Pygmalion as Prince (uncredited)
- 1938: The Drum as Abdul Fakir (uncredited)
- 1938: Kate Plus Ten as Dr. Gurdon
- 1938: Dangerous Medicine as Murdoch
- 1940: Contraband as First Brother Grimm
- 1940: Ten Days in Paris as Lanson
- 1940: The Girl in the News as Prosecuting Counsel (uncredited) directed by Carol Reed
- 1940: Law and Order as Another Agent
- 1942: The Young Mr. Pitt as Danton (uncredited)
- 1943: The Bells Go Down as Off-Screen Narrator (uncredited)
- 1944: The Way Ahead as Capt. Edwards
- 1944: Tunisian Victory as Narrator (voice)
- 1944: The Return of the Vikings as Narrator (voice)
- 1944: Henry V as The Constable of France
- 1945: Caesar and Cleopatra as Bel Affris
- 1946: Green for Danger as Mr. Eden
- 1947: Mourning Becomes Electra as Adam Brant
- 1948: The Velvet Touch as Michael Morrell
- 1948: London Belongs to Me as Narrator, introduction (uncredited)
- 1948: The Snake Pit as Dr. Mark Kik
- 1950: No Place for Jennifer as William Bailey
- 1950: I Went Back documentary with Leo Genn and as narrator
- 1950: The Wooden Horse as Peter
- 1950: The Miniver Story as Steve Brunswick
- 1951: Quo Vadis as Petronius
- 1951: The Magic Box as Maida Vale Doctor
- 1952: 24 Hours of a Woman's Life as Robert Stirling
- 1952: Plymouth Adventure as William Bradford
- 1953 The Coronation Ceremony, documentary as Narrator
- 1953 Elizabeth Is Queen, Coronation documentary as Narrator
- 1953: The Girls of Pleasure Island as Roger Halyard
- 1953: The Red Beret as Major Snow
- 1953: Personal Affair as Stephen Barlow
- 1954: The Green Scarf as Rodelec
- 1955: The Lowest Crime as Lionel Kendall
- 1955: Lady Chatterley's Lover as Sir Clifford Chatterley
- 1956: Moby Dick as Starbuck
- 1956: Beyond Mombasa as Ralph Hoyt
- 1957: The Steel Bayonet as Maj. Alan Gerrard
- 1958: Lambeth 1958 documentary directed by Raymond Kinsey, narrated By Leo Genn
- 1958: I Accuse! as Maj. Piquart
- 1958: No Time to Die as Sgt. Kendall
- 1960: Too Hot to Handle as Johnny Solo
- 1960: Era Notte a Roma as British Major Michael Pemberton
- 1962: The Longest Day as Major-General Hollander at SHAEF
- 1962 Nothing to Eat (But Food) (narrator, documentary)
- 1963: 55 Days at Peking as Gen. Jung-Lu
- 1964: The Delhi Way (narrator, documentary)
- 1964: The Secret of Dr. Mabuse as Adm. Quency
- 1965: Ten Little Indians as General Mandrake
- 1966: Circus of Fear as Elliott
- 1966: Khartoum as Narrator (uncredited)
- 1970: The Bloody Judge as Lord Wessex
- 1970: Connecting Rooms as Dr. Norman
- 1971: National Trust as Narrator
- 1971: Lizard in a Woman's Skin as Edmond Brighton
- 1971: Die Screaming, Marianne as The Judge
- 1972: Endless Night as Psychiatrist (uncredited)
- 1973: Escape to Nowhere as Chief of M.I.5
- 1973: The Mackintosh Man as Rollins (uncredited)
- 1974: Frightmare as Dr. Lytell
- 1974: The Martyr as Janusz Korczak (final film role)

== Theatre ==
- 1930 A Marriage Has Been Disarranged, Devonshire Park Theatre, Eastbourne, Royalty Theatre
- appearances in: No 17; Tiger Cats; Champion North; While Parents Sleep; Clive of India
- 1931 O.H.M.S.
- 1934–36 Old Vic Company:

1934–35 Old Vic Season

- Much Ado About Nothing
- Henry IV Part 2
- Major Barbara
- Hippolytus by Euripides
- The Two Shepherds by Sierra
- Othello
- The Taming of the Shrew, Sadler's Wells
- Saint Joan, Old Vic/Sadler's Wells
- Richard II
- Antony and Cleopatra
- Hamlet
- Shakespeare Birthday Festival- 23 April 1935
- Last Night of Shakespeare Season: scenes from Hamlet, Richard II, Taming of The Shrew, 20 May 1935

1935–36 Old Vic Season

- Julius Caesar
- Macbeth
- Richard III
- King Lear
- Saint Helena by R.C. Sherriff
- Peer Gynt
- The School for Scandal

1936–37 Old Vic Season

- Twelfth Night
- Henry V

1937–69 Later Work

- 1937 Shakespeare Birthday Festival: excerpts from Shakespeare, 23 April 1937, Old Vic
- 1937 Hamlet, as Horatio, at Elsinore
- 1938 Shakespeare Birthday Festival: excerpts from Shakespeare, 25 April 1938, Old Vic
- 1938 The Flashing Stream, Lyric Theatre & New York 1939
- 1940 The Jersey Lily by Basil Bartlett, Gate Theatre Studio
- 1944 To You, America: A Thanksgiving Day Celebration, 23 November 1944, Royal Albert Hall, the London Symphony Orchestra conducted by John Barbirolli, script by Stephen Potter
- 1946 Another Part of the Forest, New York
- 1948 Jonathan by Alan Melville, Aldwych
- 1951 The Seventh Veil, Prince's Theatre
- 1953 Henry VIII, as Buckingham, with Paul Rogers as Henry VIII, Old Vic. A Coronation Gala performance, held on 6 May 1953, in the presence of the Queen.
- 1954 The Bombshell, Westminster Theatre
- 1957 Small War on Murray Hill, New York
- 1959 The Hidden River, Cambridge Theatre
- 1961 The Devil's Advocate, New York
- 1964 Fair Game for Lovers, Cort Theatre, New York
- 1964 12 Angry Men, Queen's Theatre Jul 9–Aug 15 1964; Lyric Theatre, London Aug 25–Oct 10 1964
- 1967 The Sacred Flame, Duke of York's Theatre
- 1968 The Only Game in Town, New York
- 1968 Caesar and Cleopatra, US
- 1969 Doctor Faustus, US

== Television ==
- 1955 Omnibus: "Herod"
- 1955 Screen Director's Playhouse: "Titanic Incident"
- 1960 Mrs. Miniver with Maureen O'Hara as Mrs Miniver and Leo Genn as Clem Miniver, CBS
- 1961 The Defenders
- 1961 The Jack Paar Show, (himself)
- 1961 The Life of Adolf Hitler written & directed by Paul Rotha, commentary by Leo Genn & Marius Goring
- 1962 The Unseen Valley directed by Stephen Peet, Royal Commonwealth Society for the Blind, BBC
- 1962 An Act of Faith, a BBC documentary on Coventry Cathedral, narrated by Leo Genn
- 1963 Bob Hope Presents The Chrysler Theatre: "Commander Tony Gardiner"
- 1963 The Merv Griffin Show, (himself)
- 1964 "The Thirty Days of Gavin Heath", an episode of The Virginian, Leo Genn as Gavin Heath
- 1965 The Cat's Cradle by Hugo Charteris, an instalment of The Wednesday Play, BBC Television
- 1967 Saint Joan
- 1968 The Strange Case of Dr. Jekyll and Mr. Hyde (film)
- 1969 Strange Report
- 1969 The Expert
- 1970 Howards End (with Glenda Jackson), an instalment of Play of the Month BBC Television
- 1971 The Persuaders! "The Long Goodbye"
- 1973 The Movie Quiz
- 1973 Jackanory, narrating on three episodes
- 1974 The Zoo Gang

== Radio ==
- 1935 Penarth's Cave, a play and competition by J. Harold Carpenter, The Children's Hour BBC
- 1936 Kitchener, BBC radio
- 1937 The Company of Heaven, devised for Michaelmas by R. Ellis Roberts with music by Benjamin Britten
- 1939 Morte d'Arthur by Alfred, Lord Tennyson
- 1945 The Man of Property, Young Jolyon in Muriel Levy's adaptation of the first novel in John Galsworthy's Forsyte Saga sequence, broadcast by BBC radio in half-hourly episodes
- 1946 The Voyage of Magellan OF MAGELLAN', a dramatic chronicle in verse by Laurie Lee
- 1952 Deburau by Sacha Guitry, adapted by Dennis Arundell from the English version by Harley Granville-Barker
- 1953 Desert Island Discs, BBC, guest, (broadcast 26 June 1953).
- 1954 Dear Brutus by J. M. Barrie, BBC
- 1954 Jungle Green dramatised & produced by Alan Burgess from the book by Arthur Campbell, BBC
- 1961 No Summer at Sea by Philip Holland BBC
- 1962 The Lark by Jean Anouilh, translated by Christopher Fry, BBC
- 1963 The Enemy Below by Denys Rayner, BBC radio
- 1965 The Skin Game, by John Galsworthy, BBC radio
- 1966 Ashenden – Secret Agent 1914-1918: The Hairless Mexican, by W. Somerset Maugham, in five episodes, adapted by Howard Agg, produced by George Angell and read by Leo Genn.
- 1967 Ashenden – Secret Agent 1914-1918: Giulia Lazzari, by W. Somerset Maugham, in five episodes, adapted by Howard Agg, produced by George Angell and read by Leo Genn.
