= Bombshell =

Bombshell may refer to:

- Shell (projectile), originally called bombshell
- Bombshell (slang), a sexually attractive woman

== Television and film ==
- Bombshell (1933 film), romantic comedy directed by Victor Fleming
- Bombshell (1997 film), sci-fi thriller starring Henry Thomas and Mädchen Amick
- Bombshell (2019 film), drama starring Charlize Theron, Nicole Kidman, and Margot Robbie
- Bombshell: The Hedy Lamarr Story, a 2017 documentary film
- Bombshell (TV series), Army-based drama series, produced by Shed Media
- Bombshell (Puppet Master), a character within the Puppet Master horror film franchise
- Bombshell, Michelle Pfeiffer's role in the TV sitcom Delta House
- Bombshell (musical), the Broadway musical about Marilyn Monroe that is the subject of the TV show Smash

=== Episodes ===
- "Bombshell" (CSI: Miami)
- "Bombshell" (Law & Order: Criminal Intent)
- "Bombshells" (House)
- "Bombshells" (M*A*S*H)
- Bombshell (Smash), the first-season finale of Smash
- Bombshell, a combat robot competing in BattleBots

== Comics ==
- Bombshell (DC Comics), Member of the Teen Titans
- Bombshell (Marvel Comics), Super Villain who juggles explosives
- Bombshell, the codename of Phyllis Tanner, one of the main characters in the Dark Horse series SpyBoy
- DC Comics Bombshells, a digital first comic based upon DC Collectibles retro 1940s statues

== Music ==
- Bombshell, a 2006 album by American hard rock band Hydrogyn
- Bombshell (King Creosote album), by Scottish musician King Creosote
- Bombshell (Smash album), a 2013 soundtrack to the fictitious musical Bombshell from the TV series Smash
- Bomshel, American country music duo (commonly misspelled Bombshell)
- "Bombshell" (song), song by the Powerman 5000 from their third album Anyone for Doomsday?

== Other ==
- Berlin Bombshells, away team of the Bear City Roller Derby league based in Berlin, Germany
- CSS Bombshell, American Civil War army transport ship
- Bombshells (play), a play by Australian playwright Joanna Murray-Smith
- Bombshell: The Life and Death of Jean Harlow, a book by David Stenn
- Bombshell (video game), 2016 video game by Interceptor Entertainment and 3D Realms
- Bombshell, a biography about the life of Barbara Goette, written by her son Ludwig Leidig
- The Bombshell, a 2025 novel by Darrow Farr

== See also ==
- Blonde bombshell (disambiguation)
