= Under My Skin =

Under My Skin may refer to:

== Film and television ==
- Under My Skin (1950 film), an American sports drama film
- Under My Skin (2020 film), an Australian-American drama film
- "Under My Skin" (Doctors), a 2003 TV episode
- "Under My Skin" (Elementary), a 2015 TV episode
- "Under My Skin" (House), a 2009 TV episode

== Literature ==
- Under My Skin (autobiography), a 1994 volume of Doris Lessing's autobiography
- Under My Skin (short story collection), 2023 collection by Tom Holt
- Under My Skin, a 2012 novel by Charles de Lint
- Under My Skin, a 2018 novel by Lisa Unger

== Music ==
=== Albums ===
- Under My Skin (Gabrielle album) or the title song, 2018
- Under My Skin (Avril Lavigne album), 2004
- Under My Skin (Stephen Pearcy album) or the title song, 2008
- Under My Skin (Play album) or the title song, 2010
- Under My Skin, by Ben l'Oncle Soul, 2016
- Under My Skin, an EP by Robin Bengtsson, 2014

=== Songs ===
- "Under My Skin" (Blue System song), 1988
- "Under My Skin" (Sarah Connor song), 2008
- "Under My Skin" (Deborah Conway song), 1991
- "Under My Skin", by Aerosmith from Just Push Play, 2001
- "Under My Skin", by Jukebox the Ghost from Let Live & Let Ghosts, 2008
- "Under My Skin", by Katy B from Peace and Offerings, 2021
- "Under My Skin", by Mudvayne from L.D. 50, 2000
- "Under My Skin", by Nate Smith from Nate Smith, 2023
- "Under My Skin", by Steps from What the Future Holds, 2020
- "Under My Skin", by Gin Wigmore from Extended Play, 2008
- "Under My Skin", by Winterville from Everything in Moderation, 2005
- "Under My Skin", by Rachael Yamagata from Happenstance, 2004

== See also ==
- "I've Got You Under My Skin", a 1936 song written by Cole Porter
- Under the Skin (disambiguation)
- Under Your Skin (disambiguation)
- Underneath My Skin (disambiguation)
