= List of yachts built by Damen Yachting =

This is a list of all the yachts built by Amels, sorted by year.

Was the longest yacht upon completion.

== Amels BV ==
=== 1974–1999 ===
Year	Length overall in meters	Name	Reference
1974	59	Akula	
1974	59	Intuition II	
1974	59	Altair III	
1982	48.2	Lady Georgina	
1983	36.7	Blue Attraction	
1984	42	Tranquillity	
1985	57	Cleopatra C	
1986	57.7	Lady Mona K	
1987	42	Sheergold	
1988	40.24	Monte Carlo	
1990	36.5	Secret Love	
1991	56.2	Paris	
1993	49	Karima	
1995	78.03	Montkay	
1997	50	Tzarina	
1998	54.5	Faribana V	
1999	52	Seahorse P	
1999	75.5	Boadicea	
1999	49.99	Marla	

=== 2000–2009 ===
Year	Length overall in meters	Name	Reference
2001	52	Kiss The Sky	
2001	49.99	Malibu	
2002	62	Sarah	
2003	61.5	Solemar	
2003	54.99	La Masquerade	
2003	52	Deja Too	
2004	52	Nita K II	
2004	52	Lightning	
2004	73.69	Ilona	
2004	49.3	Volpini	
2006	68.5	Lady S	
2006	58	Astrid Conroy	
2007	67	Maria	
2007	52.3	Deniki	
2007	52.3	La Mirage	
2008	52.3	Were Dreams	
2008	52.3	Lady Nag Nag	
2009	52.3	Unity	

=== 2010–2019 ===
Year	Length overall in meters	Name	Reference
2010	54.3	Addiction	
2010	52.3	April	
2011	64.7	Imagine	
2011	54.3	Ariela	
2011	54.3	Spirit	
2012	64.7	Sea Rhapsody	
2012	55	Step One	
2012	54.3	4You	
2013	60	Event	
2013	54.3	Apollo	
2013	54.86	Gene Machine	
2013	54.86	Kamalaya	
2014	65.5	Z.	
2014	54.86	Astra	
2014	55	Serenity J	
2015	55	Vega	
2015	55	La Familia	
2015	60	Madame Kate	
2016	73.5	Plvs Vltra	
2016	55	Elixir	
2016	83	Here Comes The Sun	
2017	74	New Secret	
2017	55	Lili	
2017	55	Driftwood	
2018	62.4	Sea & Us	
2018	57.7	Volpini 2	
2018	55	Halo	
2018	74	Universe	
2019	55	Papa	
2019	55	Nomad	
2019	74	Sixth Sense	
2019	67.6	Neninka	

=== 2020–present ===
Year	Length overall in meters	Name	Reference
2020	55	Galene	
2020	62.5	Stardust	
2020	74	Synthesis	
2021	60	Stella M	
2021	60	Moonstone	
2021	74	Avanti	
2022	60	Come Together	
2022	78	Energy	
2022	74	M&Em	
2022	60	Entourage	

=== Under construction ===
Planned delivery	Length overall in meters	Name	Reference
2023 (Launched)	60	KHALIDAH	
2023	60	SATEMI	
2023	60	SOLAIA	
2024	60	21.12	
2024	74	NOME	
2025	80	Amels 80LE #1	
2025	120	Amels 120 Full Custom	
2026	80	Amels 80LE #2	
2026	80	Amels 80LE #3 / Project Zurich	

|- | 2027 | 80 | Amels 80LE #4 / Project 8004

== Damen Yachts ==
=== 2020–present ===
Year	Length overall in meters	Name	Reference
2020	62	Anawa	
2020	76.9	La Datcha	
2023	58	Pink Shadow	

=== Under construction ===
Planned delivery	Length overall in meters	Name	Reference
2024	60	SeaXplorer 60	
2024	75.20	Custom DY 75 Hybrid	
TBA	76.90	SeaXplorer 75	
TBA	105	SeaXplorer 105	

== Superyacht support vessel ==
=== 1996–2009 ===
Year	Length overall in meters	Name	Mothership	Notes	Reference
1996	28.66	Viking Legacy			
2009	33.5	No Destination		Relaunched in 2022 as a 38-metre explorer yacht.	
2009	51.3	Pursuit		First purpose built Sea Axe Fast Yacht Support vessel.	

=== 2010–2019 ===
Year	Length overall in meters	Name	Mothership	Notes	Reference
2010	51.3	Umbra	Alucia		
2012	53.25	Ad-Vantage	Vantage	Ad-Vantage started out as a firefighting and fast crew support vessel servicing offshore platforms.	
2012	67.15	Garcon	Ace	First 67m Sea Axe Fast Yacht Support Vessel.	
2014	67.15	Dapple	Flying Fox	Second 67m Sea Axe Fast Yacht Support Vessel. First named 6711	
2016	69	Intrepid	Infinity	First 69m Sea Axe Fast Yacht Support Vessel.	
2016	53.34	Ocean Warrior		New vessel for Sea Shepherd.	
2016	55	Axis	Gigi	First named Fast & Furious, later sold and renamed Axis.	
2017	69.15	Game Changer		Second 69m Sea Axe Fast Yacht Support Vessel.	
2017	55.3	Shadow	Spectre		
2018	71.5	Umm Alhoul		Originally planned for 2016. Built as part of the Nakilat Damen group.	
2018	71.5	Daloob		Originally planned for 2017. Built as part of the Nakilat Damen group.	
2018	55.30	Power Play	Mogambo		
2019	45.60	Pink Shadow	Pink Gin VI	Launched as Joy Rider. Sold and renamed Pink Shadow.	
2019	57	B3	Erica		

=== 2020–present ===
Year	Length overall in meters	Name	Mothership	Notes	Reference
2020	55.50	Gene Chaser	Gene Machine	Launched as Blue Ocean, later sold and renamed Gene Chaser.	
2021	55.50	Better space	Better Place	Launched as Time Off, later sold and renamed Better space.	
2022	75	Abeona	Koru		

=== Under construction ===
Year	Length overall in meters	Name	Reference
2023	53	Project YS 5301	

== See also ==
- List of motor yachts by length
- List of yacht support vessels by length
- Luxury yacht
- Amels Holland B.V.
