= I've Got You Under My Skin (disambiguation) =

"I've Got You Under My Skin" is a song by Cole Porter.

I've Got You Under My Skin may also refer to:

- "I've Got You Under My Skin" (Angel), a 2000 television episode
- "I've Got You Under My Skin" (Charmed), a 1998 television episode

== See also ==
- Under My Skin (disambiguation)
