= New Secret =

Luxurious superyacht built in 2017

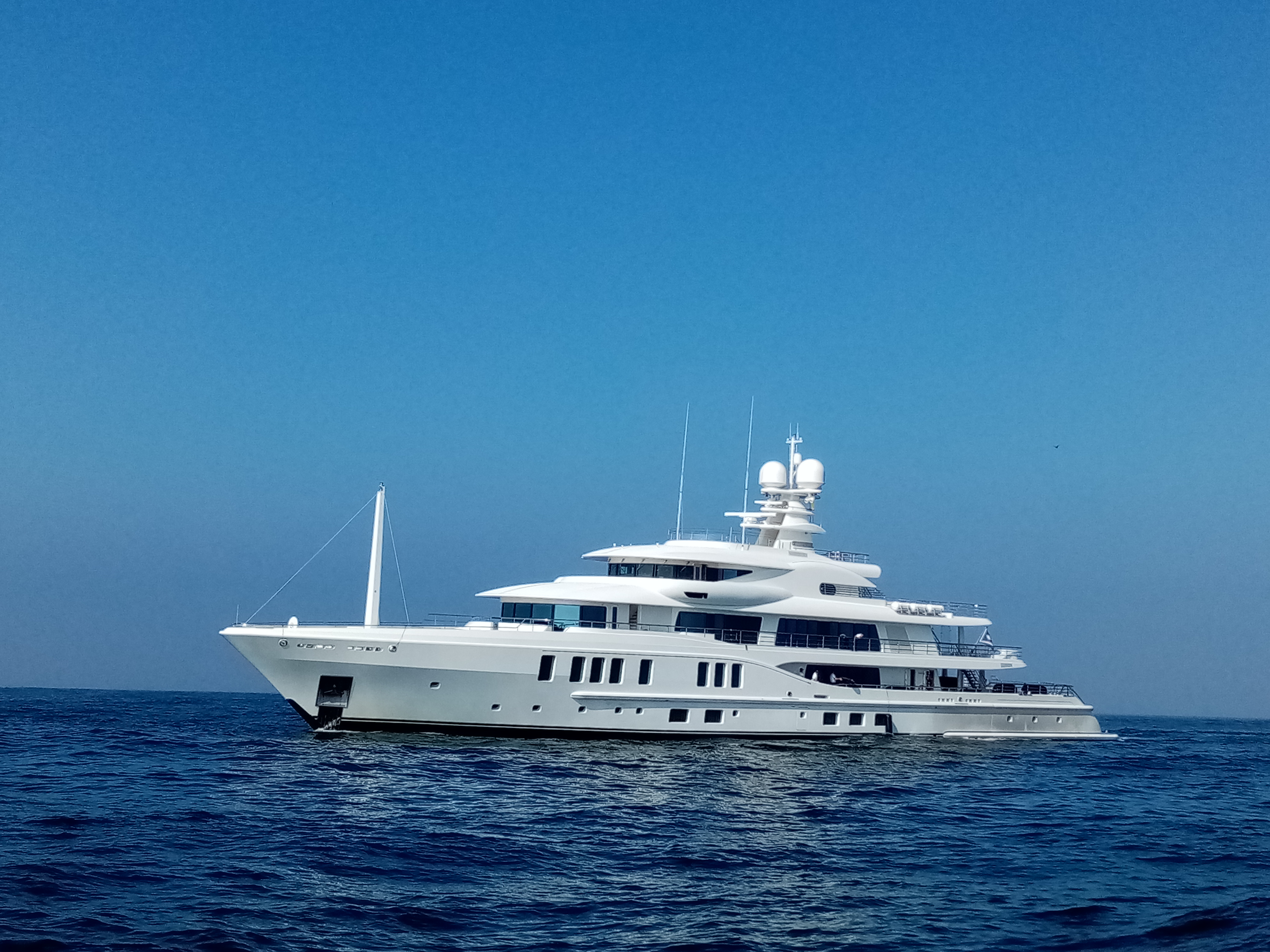

History

Marshall Islands
- Name: New Secret
- Builder: Amels Holland B.V.
- Yard number: 7402
- Launched: 2017
- Identification: IMO number: 1012907; MMSI number: 538071225; Callsign: V7MI7

General characteristics
- Class & type: Motor yacht
- Tonnage: 1790 gross tons
- Length: 74 m (243 ft)
- Beam: 12.25 m (40.2 ft)
- Draught: 3.85 m (12.6 ft)
- Speed: 16.5 knots (31 km/h) (max)

The 74 m (243 ft) superyacht New Secret was launched by Amels Holland B.V. at their yard in Vlissingen. She was designed by Tim Heywood, and the interior design was created by Winch Design. She is one of eight Amels 242 Limited Edition built between 2016 and 2024. She was delivered to her owner, Lopes Family of São Paulo, Brazil, in June 2019.

== Design ==
Her length is 74 m (243 ft), beam is 12.25 m (40.2 ft) and she has a draught of 3.85 m (12.6 ft). The hull is built out of steel while the superstructure is made out of aluminium with teak laid decks. The yacht is classed by Lloyd's registered and flagged in the Marshall Islands.

== See also ==
- List of motor yachts by length
- List of yachts built by Amels BV
