= Under My Skin (short story collection) =

Short story collection

- Author: K. J. Parker
- Cover artist: Vincent Chong
- Language: English
- Genre: Fantasy
- Publisher: Subterranean Press
- Publication date: 2023
- Publication place: United States
- Media type: print (hardcover), ebook
- Pages: 680
- ISBN: 978-1-64524-079-2
- Preceded by: The Father of Lies

Under My Skin is a collection of fantasy short stories by British writer Tom Holt, writing as K. J. Parker. It is the third of three Parker collections from Subterranean Press and was first published in hardcover and eBook in March 2023.

== Summary ==
The book collects thirteen short works of fiction by the author.

== Contents ==
- "The Return of The Pig" (from The Book of Magic, October 2018)
- "The Thought That Counts" (from Beneath Ceaseless Skies #250, April 2018)
- "Mightier than the Sword" (from Subterranean Press, May 2017)
- "All Love Excelling" (first appearance)
- "Many Mansions" (from Beneath Ceaseless Skies #313, September 2020)
- "My Beautiful Life" (originally published as My Beautiful Life, Subterranean Press, November 2019)
- "Stronger" (from Beneath Ceaseless Skies #340, October 2020)
- "Portrait of the Artist" (from Beneath Ceaseless Skies #287, September 2019)
- "Prosper's Demon" (originally published as Prosper's Demon, Tor.com, January 2020)
- "The Best Man Wins" (from The Book of Swords, October 2017)
- "Habitat" (from The Book of Dragons, April 2021)
- "The Big Score" (originally published as The Big Score, Subterranean Press, March 2021)
- "Relics" (first appearance)

== Reception ==
The collection was reviewed by Gary K. Wolfe in Locus #748, May 2023, by Andrew Mather in The Quill To Live, September 2023, by Jeroen Admiraal in A Sky of Books and Movies, January 2024, and by Teresa Edgerton in Chronicles, May 2024.

== Awards ==
The collection was nominated for the British Fantasy Award 2024.
