= The Delhi Way =

- Directed by: James Ivory
- Written by: James Ivory
- Produced by: James Ivory
- Narrated by: Leo Genn
- Cinematography: James Ivory
- Edited by: James Ivory
- Music by: Ustad Vilayat Khan; Ustad Shantaprasad
- Release date: 1964
- Running time: 50 minutes
- Country: United States
- Language: English

The Delhi Way is a 1964 documentary about Delhi produced, written, photographed and directed by James Ivory. It is narrated by Leo Genn.
