= Under Your Skin =

Under Your Skin may refer to:

- Under Your Skin (album), a 2011 album by Saliva
- "Under Your Skin" (song), a 2017 song by Seeb and Rock City
- Under Your Skin (film), a 1966 Finnish film
- "Under Your Skin", a song by Luscious Jackson from the 1996 album Fever In Fever Out

== See also ==
- Under Our Skin, 2008 film about Lyme disease
- Under My Skin (disambiguation)
- Under the Skin (disambiguation)
