= Robin Bengtsson discography =

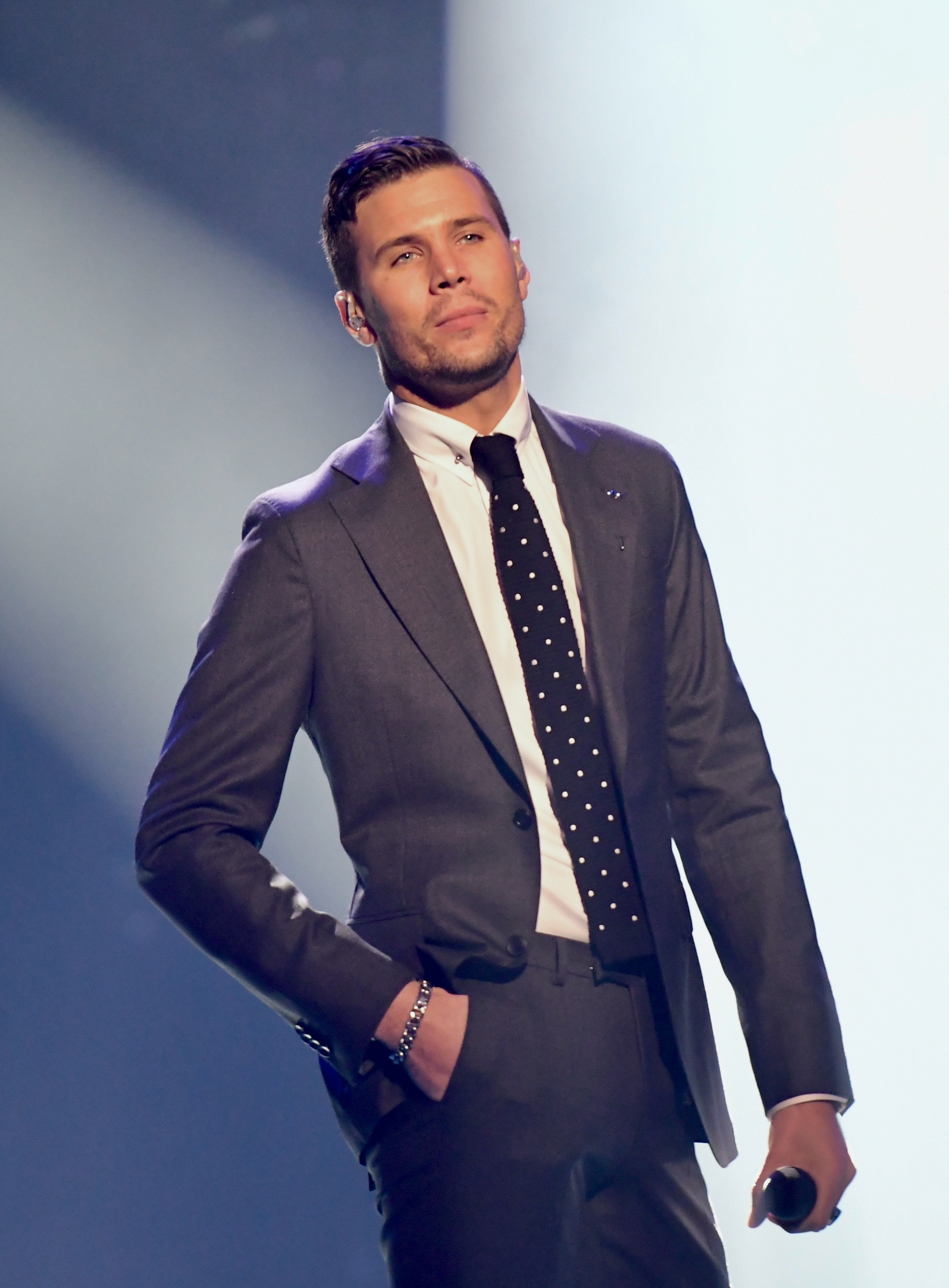
- Robin Bengtsson after performing at the rehearsals for the third semi-final of Melodifestivalen 2017.
- EPs: 1
- Singles: 30

The discography of Swedish singer Robin Bengtsson consists of 30 singles. Six music singles that charted after he had performed them during his participation in Idol 2008. And one EP named Under My Skin, released in 2014 by the record label Merion Music Group. Two of the songs, "Constellation Prize" and "I Can't Go On" competed in Melodifestivalen. Constellation Prize placed fifth in 2016, and I Can't Go On won the 2017 edition of the contest and was Sweden's entry for the Eurovision Song Contest 2017 in Ukraine.

== Extended plays ==
Title	Details
Under My Skin	Released: 8 May 2014; Label: Merion Music Group; Format: Digital download
It's the Most Wonderful Time of the Year	Released: 29 November 2024; Format: Digital download
Honey Honey	Released: 6 February 2026; Format: Digital download

== Singles ==
=== As lead artist ===
Title	Year	Peak chart positions						Certifications	Album
Title	Year	SWE	FRA	POL	SCO	SPA	SWI	Certifications	Album
"Fields of Gold"	2008	15	—	—	—	—	—		Non-album singles
"Another Lover's Gone"	2009	8	—	—	—	—	—		Non-album singles
"Long Long Night" (with Kim Fransson)	2010	—	—	—	—	—	—		Non-album singles
"Cross the Universe"	2012	—	—	—	—	—	—		Non-album singles
"I Don't Like to Wait"	2013	—	—	—	—	—	—		Under My Skin
"Fired" (featuring J-Son)	2014	—	—	—	—	—	—		Under My Skin
"Sleep On It"	2014	—	—	—	—	—	—		Non-album singles
"Constellation Prize"	2016	2	—	—	—	—	—	GLF: 2× Platinum	Non-album singles
"I Can't Go On"	2017	3	130	19	66	27	83	GLF: 2× Platinum	Non-album singles
"Dark Angel"	2017	—	—	—	—	—	—		Non-album singles
"Day by Day"	2018	—	—	—	—	—	—		Non-album singles
"Liar"	2018	—	—	—	—	—	—		Non-album singles
"I Wanna Fall In Love Again"	2018	—	—	—	—	—	—		Non-album singles
"Never Born to Love"	2018	—	—	—	—	—	—		Non-album singles
"The First to Know"	2019	—	—	—	—	—	—		Non-album singles
"Already Know"	2019	—	—	—	—	—	—		Non-album singles
"Friendzoned" (with JLC)	2019	24	—	—	—	—	—	GLF: Gold	Non-album singles
"Mama's Song"	2019	—	—	—	—	—	—		Non-album singles
"Just Let It Go"	2019	—	—	—	—	—	—		Non-album singles
"Take a Chance"	2020	13	—	—	—	—	—	GLF: Gold	Non-album singles
"I Don't Wanna Be"	2020	—	—	—	—	—	—		Non-album singles
"Dancing with the Stars"	2020	—	—	—	—	—	—		Non-album singles
"Die with You"	2020	—	—	—	—	—	—		Non-album singles
"Honey I'm Home"	2020	—	—	—	—	—	—		Non-album singles
"Walk On By" (with Victoria Voss)	2021	—	—	—	—	—	—		Non-album singles
"If I Was You"	2021	—	—	—	—	—	—		Non-album singles
"Brother, That's All Right"	2021	—	—	—	—	—	—		Non-album singles
"Oh My God" (with Victoria Voss)	2021	—	—	—	—	—	—		Non-album singles
"Innocent Love"	2022	10	—	—	—	—	—	GLF: Gold	Non-album singles
"Lullaby"	2023	—	—	—	—	—	—		Non-album singles
"Out of Love"	2024	—	—	—	—	—	—		Honey Honey
"Hometown"	2024	—	—	—	—	—	—		Honey Honey
"Still Be Mine"	2024	—	—	—	—	—	—		Honey Honey
"Spin the Bottle"	2025	—	—	—	—	—	—		Honey Honey
"Honey Honey"	2026	15	—	—	—	—	—		Honey Honey
"—" denotes a single that did not chart or was not released in that territory.

=== As featured artist ===
Title	Year	Album
"Tjena Tjena Tjena" (Kriss featuring Robin Bengtsson)	2012	Non-album singles
"Paper Cuts" (G&G vs Dave Darrell featuring Robin Bengtsson)	2013	Non-album singles
"Something's Bothering Me" (Lotus featuring Robin Bengtsson & Pitfall)	2016	Non-album singles

=== Promotional singles ===
Title	Year	Peak chart positions	Album
Title	Year	SWE	Album
"När vindarna viskar mitt namn"	2008	58	Non-album singles
"Dude Looks Like a Lady"	2008	44	Non-album singles
"(Sittin On) The Dock of the Bay"	2008	39	Non-album singles
"My Love Is Your Love"	2008	21	Non-album singles
"Joyful, Joyful"	2008	54	Non-album singles
"Black or White"	2008	36	Non-album singles
"Wake Up World" (with Karl Martindahl & Daniel Karlsson)	2011	—	Non-album singles
"Nothing in Return"	2014	—	Non-album singles
"Stevie Wonder"	2016	— (Note: "Stevie Wonder" did not enter the Swedish Singles Chart, but peaked at number 18 on the Swedish Heatseeker chart.)	Non-album singles
"That's Christmas to Me / Have Yourself a Merry Little Christmas"	2016	—	Non-album singles
"—" denotes a single that did not chart or was not released in that territory.
