= Expecting Someone Taller =

1987 humorous fantasy novel by Tom Holt

- First edition (UK)
- Author: Tom Holt
- Cover artist: Graham Thompson
- Language: English
- Genre: Satirical Fantasy novel
- Publisher: Macmillan Publishers; St. Martin's Press
- Publication date: 1987
- Publication place: United Kingdom
- Media type: Print (Hardback & Paperback)
- ISBN: 0-333-44002-1
- Preceded by: Lucia Triumphant
- Followed by: Who's Afraid of Beowulf?

Expecting Someone Taller is a humorous fantasy novel by British author Tom Holt. Holt's first novel, it is a humorous sequel to Wagner's Der Ring des Nibelungen, set in contemporary England.

It was published in hardcover in 1987, by Macmillan Publishers in the United Kingdom, and by St. Martin's Press in the United States. A UK paperback edition was released in 1988 by Futura Orbit in 1988, and a US paperback edition was released in 1990 by Ace Books. The book was released in the 5th omnibus of Holt's books entitled Tall Stories.

== Premise ==
When Malcolm Fisher runs over a badger one night, he discovers that the badger was secretly the giant Ingolf, brother of Fafnir: consequently, Fisher becomes the new owner of the Ring of the Nibelung and the Tarnhelm, and, thereby, ruler of the world.

However, Wotan, king of the gods, still wants the ring, as do others, and Fisher finds himself pursued by numerous characters from Wagner's opera.

== Reception ==
Expecting Someone Taller was nominated for the 1991 Crawford Award.

The New York Times described it as "a fluffy and innocent but intelligent little comedy", and compared it to be P. G. Wodehouse and Woody Allen, but also emphasized that Holt had not yet "firmly mastered his craft".

Kirkus Reviews considered it to be "a string of comic set-pieces, ranging from the amusing to the improbable and worse", and declared it "(f)roth for Wagner fans. Elective for all others".

== Editions ==
- McMillan, London, 1987 — ISBN 0-333-44002-1
- St. Martin's, NY, 1987 — ISBN 0-312-01426-0
- Futura Orbit, London 1988 — ISBN 0-7088-8264-1
- Ace Books, NY, 1990 — ISBN 0-441-22332-X
- ISBN 1-85723-181-3
