= Under the Skin =

Under the Skin may refer to:

== Film and television ==
- Under the Skin (1997 film), a British film
- Under the Skin (2013 film), a British film based on Michel Faber's novel
- Under the Skin (TV series), a 1994 Australian series
- Under the Skin, a 2003 digital film by Shelagh Cluett
- Under the Skin, a 2003 video by Skid Row
- "Under the Skin" (Criminal Minds), a 2020 television episode
- "Under the Skin" (CSI: Vegas), a 2021 television episode
- "Under the Skin" (Murder City), a 2004 television episode

== Literature and theatre ==
- Under the Skin (novel), a 2000 novel by Michel Faber
- Under the Skin (play), a 2013 play by Yonatan Calderon
- Under the Skin, a 2003 novel by James Carlos Blake

== Music ==
- Under the Skin (Ice album), 1993
- Under the Skin (Lindsey Buckingham album), 2006
- Under the Skin (Code Orange album), 2020
- "Under the Skin", a 1991 song by Raven from Architect of Fear

== Other uses ==
- Subcutaneous tissue
- Under the Skin (video game), a 2004 video game from Capcom
- Blacksad: Under the Skin, a 2019 video game based on the Franco-Spanish comics
- Under the Skin with Russell Brand, a podcast

== See also ==
- Under My Skin (disambiguation)
- Under Your Skin (disambiguation)
- Underneath My Skin (disambiguation)
