= Flying Dutch =

1991 humorous-fantasy novel by Tom Holt

- First edition, cover art by Josh Kirby
- Author: Tom Holt
- Genre: Fantasy novel
- Publisher: Orbit Books
- Publication date: 1991
- ISBN: 0-356-20111-2

Flying Dutch (ISBN 0-356-20111-2) is the third humorous-fantasy novel by popular British author Tom Holt. First published in the UK in 1991 by Orbit Books.

Inspired by Wagner's 1843 opera The Flying Dutchman, the novel asserts that the famous Dutchman and his crew were not, in fact, cursed by the Devil, but were instead the victim of a flawed alchemical experiment which made them immortal, but, as a side effect, gave them a horrible, unbearable stench. Every seven years, the stench wears off, briefly, and the crew can land and reprovision. However, modern technology is catching up with the Dutchman, and compound interest on his ancient life-insurance policy threatens the entire world's economy.

== Reception ==
Publishers Weekly considered it to be "diverting" and "occasionally hilarious", but also "creaky". Kirkus Reviews was far harsher, decrying its "mechanical plotting, predictable doings, and humor too obvious and trite to raise even a glimmer of a smile."

The Los Angeles Times found it to be "ingenious", with a "sardonic, breezy tone", and compared it to the works of Terry Gilliam, but faulted its second half for not living up to the standard set by its first half.

The novel earned 17th place in Locus magazine's annual Best Fantasy Novel of the Year awards in 1992.
