= Event (yacht) =

History

Cayman Islands
- Name: Event
- Owner: Xu Jiayin
- Builder: Amels Holland B.V.
- Yard number: 199#1
- Launched: 2013
- In service: 2013
- Identification: IMO number: 1011642; MMSI number: 319056400; Callsign: ZGCZ6

General characteristics
- Class & type: Motor yacht
- Tonnage: 1075 gross tons
- Length: 62.40 m (204.7 ft)
- Beam: 10.32 m (33.9 ft)
- Draught: 3.45 m (11.3 ft)
- Propulsion: twin 1500 kW Caterpillar 3512C engines
- Speed: 13 knots (24 km/h)
- Capacity: 12 guests
- Crew: 13

Event is a 62.40 m (204.7 ft) superyacht launched by Amels Holland B.V. at their yard in Vlissingen. She was designed by Tim Heywood, and the interior design was by Laura Sessa of Nuvolari Lenard, who also christened the yacht. She has two sister ships, the 2018 built Sea & Us and the 2015 built Madame Kate.

== Design ==
Her length is 62.40 m (204.7 ft), beam is 10.32 m (33.9 ft) and she has a draught of 3.45 m (11.3 ft). The hull is built out of steel while the superstructure is made out of aluminium with teak laid decks. The yacht is Lloyd's registered, issued by Cayman Islands.

Some of the yacht's features include an enclosed lounge on the sun deck, a helicopter platform on the foredeck, and two folding balconies, and a beach club with a swim platform, retractable stairs, a sauna, steam shower and gym equipment.

== Propulsion ==
She is powered by twin Caterpillar 3512C engines.

== See also ==
- List of motor yachts by length
- List of yachts built by Amels BV
