= Plvs Vltra (yacht) =

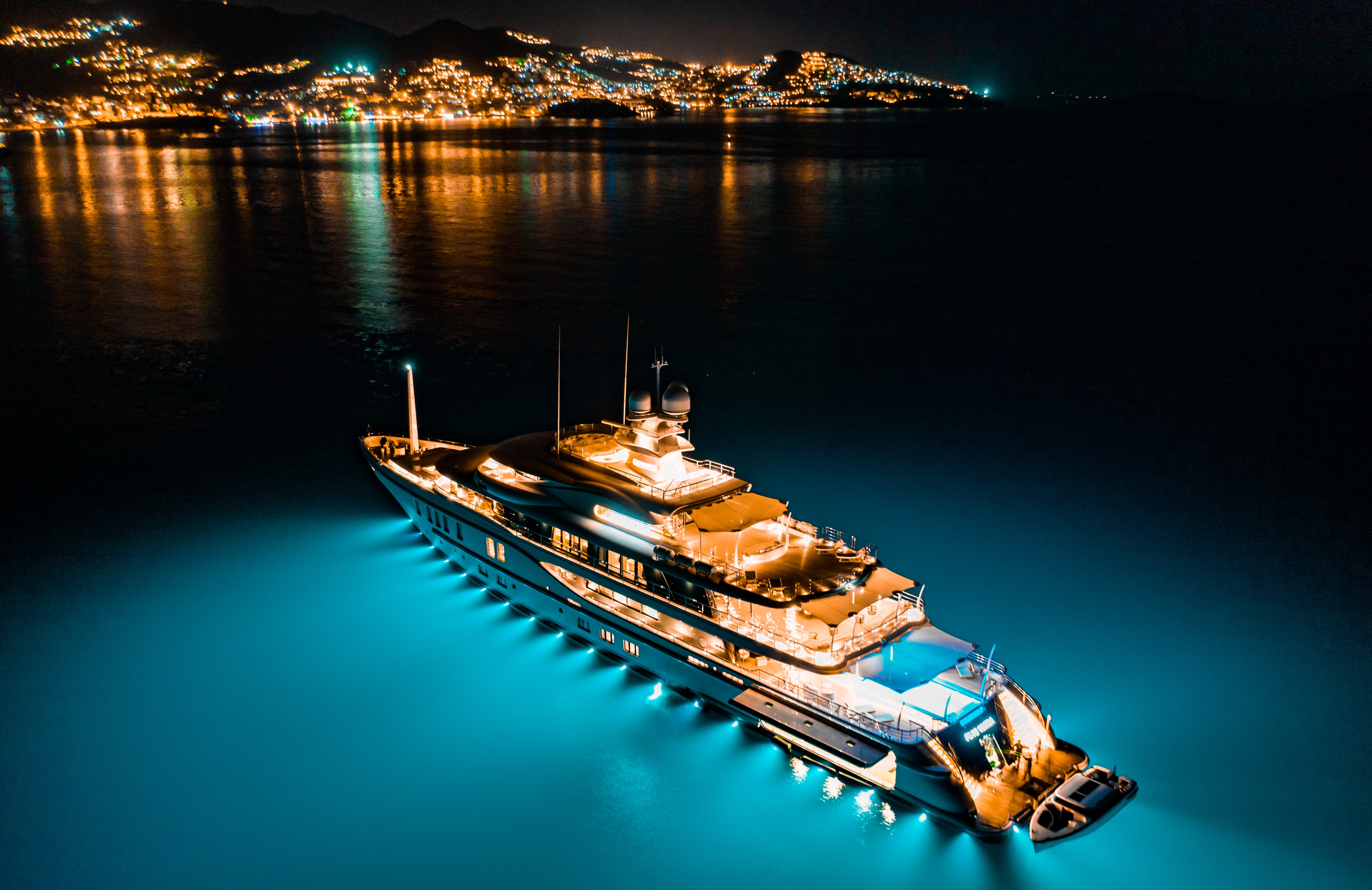
- Plvs Vltra at anchor near Bodrum, Turkey, in 2019

History

Panama
- Name: Plvs Vltra
- Builder: Amels Holland B.V.
- Yard number: 7401
- Launched: 2016
- In service: 2016
- Identification: IMO number: 9600683; MMSI number: 352001955; Callsign: 3E2795

General characteristics
- Class & type: Motor yacht
- Tonnage: 1,787 GT
- Length: 74 m (243 ft)
- Beam: 12.46 m (40.9 ft)
- Draught: 3.85 m (12.6 ft)
- Speed: 16.5 knots (31 km/h) (max)

The 74 m (243 ft) superyacht Plvs Vltra was launched by Amels Holland B.V. at their yard in Vlissingen. Her new-construction was supervised by Moran Yacht & Ship, which negotiated the build contract and managed the yacht's day-to-day construction at the Amels shipyard. She was designed by Tim Heywood, and the interior design was created by Winch Design. She is the first of an eight Amels 242 Limited Edition serie built between 2016 and 2024.

== Design ==
Her length is 73.50 m (241.1 ft), beam is 12.46 m (40.9 ft) and she has a draught of 3.85 m (12.6 ft). The hull is built out of steel while the superstructure is made out of aluminium with teak laid decks. The yacht is classed by Lloyd's Register and flagged in the Cayman Islands.

== See also ==
- List of motor yachts by length
- List of yachts built by Amels BV
