= Who's Afraid of Beowulf? =

1988 novel by Tom Holt

- First edition
- Author: Tom Holt
- Language: English
- Genre: Satirical Fantasy novel
- Publisher: Macmillan Publishers
- Publication date: 1988
- Publication place: United Kingdom
- Media type: Print (Paperback)
- Pages: 210 pp
- ISBN: 0-441-88591-8
- OCLC: 24426393
- Preceded by: Expecting Someone Taller

Who’s Afraid of Beowulf? is the second humorous-fantasy novel by popular British author Tom Holt, first published in the UK in 1988 by Macmillan Publishers. Unlike Holt's other early books, this is not based on any particular opera or well-known mythic cycle.

== Summary ==
When American archeologist Hildy Frederiksen investigates an ancient Viking burial ship in Scotland, she finds that the Viking heroes on board are still alive, even though centuries have passed. Now she must help them defeat the evil sorcerer king.

== Reception ==
Publishers Weekly called it "(p)art slapstick, part fantasy (...and) all entertainment" and "unforced and inventive".

Kirkus Reviews found it to be "sprightly (and) well-plotted", and "grinworthy", but faulted Holt's portrayal of Hildy, stating that "(i)n neither speech nor deed is (she)a very convincing American".
