= James Ivory =

American film director and screenwriter (born 1928)

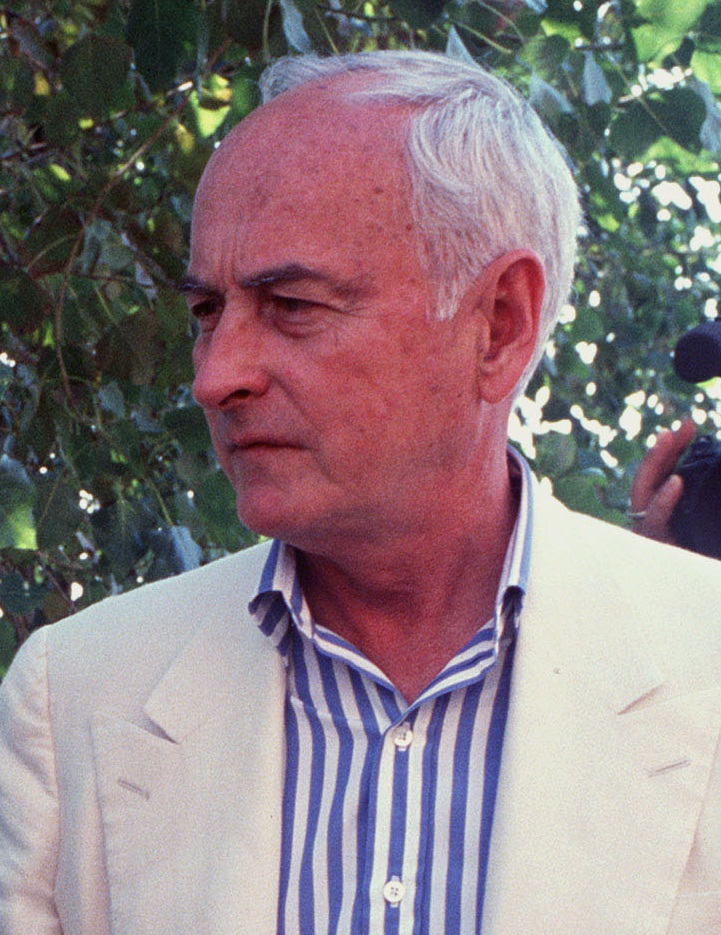
- Ivory at the 1991 Venice International Film Festival
- Born: Richard Jerome Hazen; June 7, 1928 (age 98); Berkeley, California, U.S.
- Education: University of Oregon; University of Southern California
- Occupations: Film director; screenwriter; producer
- Years active: 1953–present
- Partner: Ismail Merchant (1961–2005; Merchant's death)
- Awards: Full list

James Francis Ivory (born Richard Jerome Hazen; June 7, 1928) is an American film director, screenwriter, and producer. He was a principal in Merchant Ivory Productions along with Indian film producer Ismail Merchant (his domestic and professional partner) and screenwriter Ruth Prawer Jhabvala. The trio made film adaptations of stories by authors such as E.M. Forster and Henry James. Their body of work is celebrated for its elegance, sophistication, literary fidelity, strong performances, complex themes, and rich characters.

Merchant–Ivory was established in 1961 in India where they made modestly budgeted films including The Householder (1963), Shakespeare Wallah (1965), and Bombay Talkie (1970). Ivory began adapting films from classic novels such as The Europeans (1979), Quartet (1981), Heat and Dust (1983), The Bostonians (1984), Maurice (1987), and Mr. & Mrs. Bridge (1990). During this period he was nominated for the Academy Award for Best Director for A Room with a View (1985), Howards End (1992), and The Remains of the Day (1993). At the age of 89, Ivory won the Academy Award for Best Adapted Screenplay for his work on Luca Guadagnino's Call Me by Your Name (2017), becoming the oldest competitive Academy Award winner.

Ivory's accolades also include three BAFTAs, and a Writers Guild of America Award as well as nominations for three Golden Globe Awards. He received the Directors Guild of America Lifetime Achievement Award in 1995. Ivory released his autobiography Solid Ivory: Memoirs (2021) and directed the documentary A Cooler Climate (2022).

== Early years and education ==
James Ivory was born Richard Jerome Hazen on June 7, 1928, in Berkeley, California, and adopted shortly after birth by Hallie Millicent (née de Loney) and Edward Patrick Ivory, a sawmill operator; who renamed him James Francis Ivory. He grew up in Klamath Falls, Oregon. He attended the University of Oregon, where he received a degree in fine arts in 1951. Ivory is a recipient of the Lawrence Medal, UO's College of Design's highest honor for its graduates. His papers are held by UO Libraries' Special Collections and University Archives. He was UO's 2019-2020 honorary degree recipient.

Ivory then attended the University of Southern California School of Cinematic Arts, where he directed the short film Four in the Morning (1953). He wrote, photographed, and produced Venice: Theme and Variations, a half-hour documentary submitted as his thesis film for his master's degree in cinema. The film was named by The New York Times in 1957 as one of the ten best non-theatrical films of the year. He graduated from USC in 1957.

== Career ==
=== 1959–1978: Beginnings and early films ===
Ivory met producer Ismail Merchant at a screening of Ivory's documentary The Sword and the Flute in New York City in 1959. In May 1961, Merchant and Ivory formed the film production company Merchant Ivory Productions. Merchant and Ivory became long-term life partners. Their professional and romantic relationship commenced in 1961 and continued until Merchant's death in 2005.

Ivory's professional partnership with Merchant has a place in the Guinness Book of World Records for the longest partnership in independent cinema history. Before Merchant's death in 2005, they produced 40 films, including a number of films that received Academy, BAFTA and Golden Globe awards. Ivory directed 17 theatrical films for Merchant Ivory, and novelist Ruth Prawer Jhabvala was the screenwriter for 22 of their productions in addition to another film produced by Merchant Ivory after Merchant's death.

Ismail Merchant once commented: "It is a strange marriage we have at Merchant Ivory ... I am an Indian Muslim, Ruth is a German Jew, and Jim is a Protestant American. Someone once described us as a three-headed god. Maybe they should have called us a three-headed monster!"

=== 1979–1993: Breakthrough and acclaim ===
In 1986, Ivory directed a film adaptation of the classic E. M. Forster novel A Room with a View. The film starred Helena Bonham Carter who was 18 years old at the time, in her first major film role. The film also co-starred Julian Sands, Maggie Smith, Judi Dench, Denholm Elliott, Simon Callow, and Daniel Day-Lewis. The film received universal praise with The Chicago Sun-Times film critic Roger Ebert gave the film four out of four stars, writing: "It is an intellectual film, but intellectual about emotions: It encourages us to think about how we feel, instead of simply acting on our feelings." The film received eight Academy Award nominations including Best Director for Ivory. He also received Best Director nominations from the British Academy Film Awards, the Golden Globes Awards, and the Directors Guild of America.

The following year Ivory directed another Forster adaptation, the romantic drama Maurice (1987). The film is a gay love story in the restrictive and repressed culture of Edwardian England. The story follows its main character, Maurice Hall, through university, a tumultuous relationship, struggling to fit into society, and ultimately being united with his life partner. The film stars James Wilby and Hugh Grant in their first major film appearances, and also features Rupert Graves, Simon Callow, Denholm Elliott, Mark Tandy, Billie Whitelaw, Judy Parfitt, Phoebe Nicholls, and Ben Kingsley. In a 2017 retrospective in The New Yorker, Sarah Larson wrote, "...For many gay men coming of age in the eighties and nineties, Maurice was revelatory: a first glimpse, onscreen or anywhere, of what love between men could look like". Director James Ivory has added to the legacy on the film saying, "So many people have come up to me since Maurice and pulled me aside and said, 'I just want you to know you changed my life.'" Ivory won the Venice Film Festival's Silver Lion for Best Director.

This was followed in 1990 by Mr. & Mrs. Bridge, which was adapted by Jhabvala from the novels by Evan S. Connell. According to Ivory, "the world of Mr. and Mrs. Bridge is the world I grew up in...It's the only film I've ever made that was about my own childhood and adolescence." The film received an Oscar nomination for Best Actress (Joanne Woodward), as well as two New York Film Critics Circle awards. Ivory would later call Mr. & Mrs. Bridge a personal favorite, adding that it was the one film he would most like to see reappraised.

In 1992, Merchant-Ivory tackled their third Forster adaptation, Howards End, based on the acclaimed novel and starring Emma Thompson, Helena Bonham Carter, Anthony Hopkins, and Vanessa Redgrave. The film premiered at the 1992 Cannes Film Festival where it competed for the Palme d'Or and went on to critical acclaim. Ivory received his second Academy Award for Best Director nomination. The film also received three Academy Awards for Best Actress (Emma Thompson), Best Adapted Screenplay, and Best Production Design. The film also received eleven British Academy Film Award nominations, and four Golden Globe Award nominations. In 2016, the film was selected for screening as part of the Cannes Classics section at the 2016 Cannes Film Festival, and was released theatrically after restoration on August 26, 2016.

The following year, Merchant-Ivory directed the period drama The Remains of the Day (1993), adapted from the acclaimed novel of the same name by Kazuo Ishiguro. American filmmaker Mike Nichols served as one of the film's producers, and the film reunited Anthony Hopkins and Emma Thompson. Supporting performances included James Fox, Christopher Reeve, Hugh Grant, and Lena Headey. The film revolved around a dedicated butler who serves an English landlord in the years leading up to the second World War. The film was a commercial and critical success with Vincent Canby of The New York Times said, in another favorable review, "Here's a film for adults. It's also about time to recognize that Mr. Ivory is one of our finest directors, something that critics tend to overlook because most of his films have been literary adaptations." The film received eight Academy Award nominations with Ivory receiving his third nomination for Best Director. He also received nominations from the British Academy Film Awards, Golden Globe Awards, and Directors Guild of America.

In 1999, the British Film Institute ranked The Remains of the Day the 64th-greatest British film of the 20th century.

=== 1995–2009: Established work ===
In 1995 he directed the film Jefferson in Paris starring Nick Nolte as Thomas Jefferson, Thandiwe Newton as Sally Hemings, and Gwyneth Paltrow as Patsy Jefferson. The following year he directed the film Surviving Picasso starring Anthony Hopkins as the painter Pablo Picasso. In 1998 he directed and co-wrote the film A Soldier's Daughter Never Cries, a film divided into three segments each named after a different protagonist. In 2000 he directed the romantic period drama The Golden Bowl which was adapted from the Henry James novel of the same name. He directed the romantic comedy Le Divorce starring Kate Hudson and Naomi Watts.

In 2005 he directed the film The White Countess written by Kazuo Ishiguro starring Ralph Fiennes, Natasha Richardson, and Vanessa Redgrave. In 2009, Ivory reunited with Anthony Hopkins for the romantic drama The City of Your Final Destination co-starring Laura Linney. The film is the first Merchant Ivory film production without the participation of producer Ismail Merchant due to his death in 2005.

=== 2017–present: Career resurgence ===
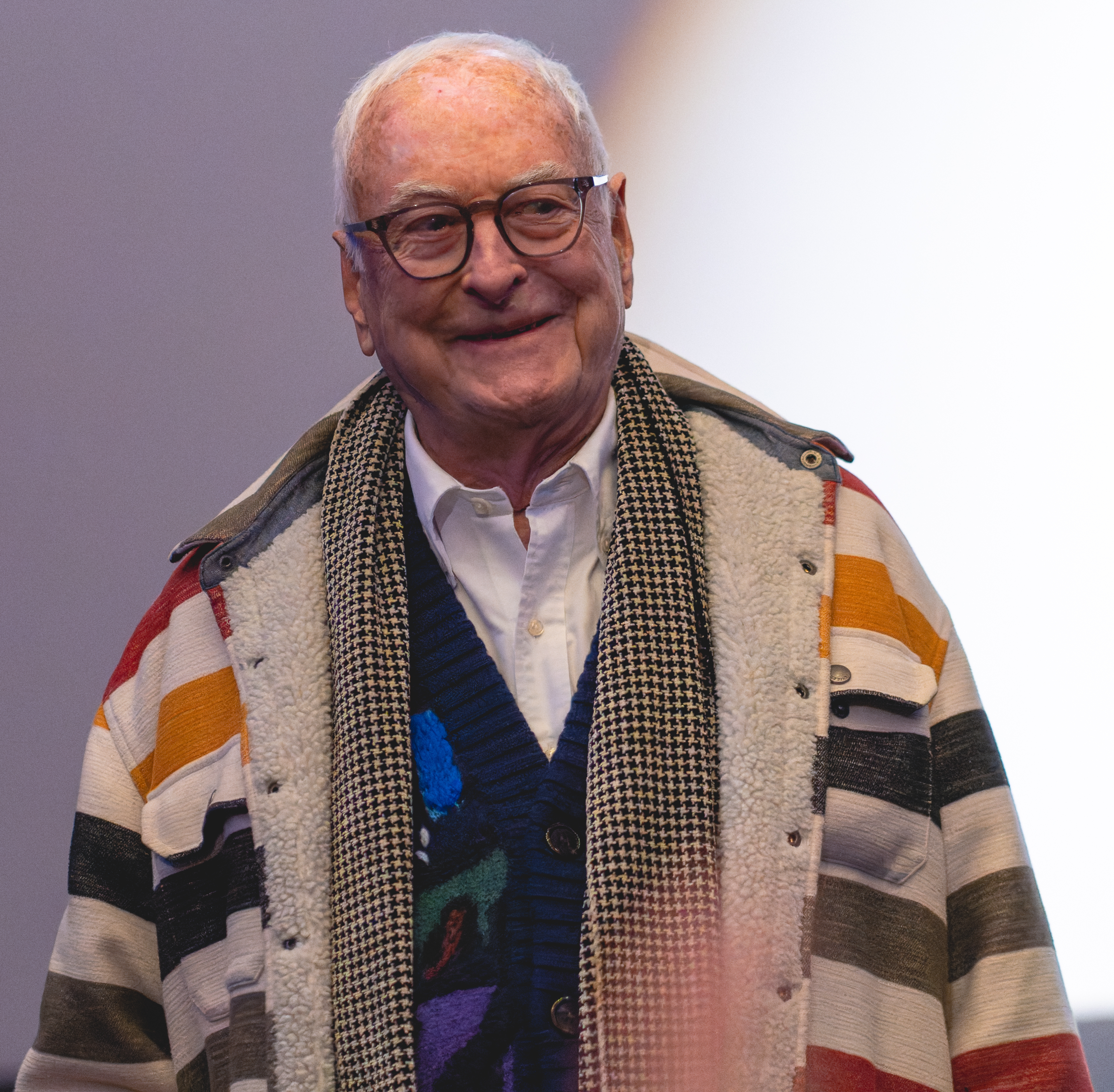
Ivory at a film presentation in 2024

In 2017, Ivory wrote and co-produced the film adaptation of Call Me by Your Name, a 2007 coming-of-age novel by André Aciman. The film, a romantic drama, was directed by Luca Guadagnino and is the final installment in his thematic "Desire" trilogy, following I Am Love (2009), and A Bigger Splash (2015). Set in 1983 in northern Italy, the story chronicles the romantic relationship between a 17-year-old, Elio Perlman (Timothée Chalamet), and Oliver (Armie Hammer), a 24-year-old graduate-student assistant to Elio's father (Michael Stuhlbarg), an archaeology professor.

Ivory originally was to co-direct the film based on Guadagnino's suggestion; however, there was no contract to that effect. Ivory accepted the offer to co-direct on the condition that he would also write the film; he spent "about nine months" on the screenplay. Ivory stepped down from a directorial role in 2016, leaving Guadagnino to direct the film alone. According to Ivory, financiers from Memento Films International did not want two directors involved with the project because they "thought it would be awkward ... It might take longer, it would look terrible if we got in fights on the set, and so on." Guadagnino said Ivory's version would have likely been "a much more costly [and] different film" that would have been too expensive to make. Ivory retained the sole credit as screenwriter. The film was the only narrative feature he has written but not directed. Despite stepping aside as director, he continued to remain involved with other aspects of the production.

The film premiered at the Sundance Film Festival and garnered huge critical success. Ivory's screenplay brought him numerous awards and nominations. Ivory won awards for Best Adapted Screenplay from the Academy Awards, British Academy Film Awards, Writers Guild of America, the Critics' Choice Awards, and the Scripter Awards, among others. Upon winning the Oscar and BAFTA at the age of 89, Ivory became the oldest-ever winner in any category for both awards.

In 2018, Ivory took part in the film Dance Again with Me Heywood! directed by Michele Diomà. At 94 he directed the documentary film, A Cooler Climate (2022), about boxes of film footage he shot during a life-changing trip to Afghanistan in 1960, which had its world premiere at the New York Film Festival in 2022. Raymond Ang of GQ wrote that the project "might be the most personal" film of his career. In May 2023, a biographical documentary portrait directed by Christopher Manning, James Ivory: In Search of Love and Beauty, was announced; the film chronicles Ivory's life and work and features Helena Bonham Carter, Emma Thompson, Hugh Grant, Wes Anderson and others.

== Personal life ==
Ivory is gay. His memoir, Solid Ivory, gives details of his relationships with his business partner, Ismail Merchant; their composer, Richard Robbins; and others such as Bruce Chatwin. Merchant was Ivory's long-term life partner. Their professional and romantic partnership lasted 44 years, from 1961 until Merchant's death in 2005.

Ivory has owned several homes, including the Jacob Rutsen Van Rensselaer House and Mill Complex in Claverack, New York.

== Works ==
=== Filmography ===
Year	Title	Director	Writer	Producer	Notes
1953	Four in the Morning	Yes	No	Yes	Short film
1957	Venice: Theme and Variations	Yes	No	Yes	Short film
1959	The Sword and the Flute	Yes	No	Yes	Short film
1963	The Householder	Yes	Yes	No	Feature directorial debut Co-screenwriter (with Ruth Prawer Jhabvala)
1964	The Delhi Way	Yes	Yes	Yes	Documentary; Also cinematographer and editor
1965	Shakespeare Wallah	Yes	Yes	No	Co-writer (with Ruth Prawer Jhabvala)
1969	The Guru	Yes	Yes	No	Co-writer (with Ruth Prawer Jhabvala)
1970	Bombay Talkie	Yes	Yes	No	Co-writer (with Ruth Prawer Jhabvala)
1972	Adventures of a Brown Man in Search of Civilization	Yes	Yes	No	BBC TV documentary
1972	Savages	Yes	Idea	No	Screenplay based on an original idea by Ivory
1973	Helen, Queen of the Nautch Girls	No	Yes	No	Short film
1975	Autobiography of a Princess	Yes	No	No	
1975	The Wild Party	Yes	No	No	
1977	Roseland	Yes	No	No	
1978	Hullabaloo Over Georgie and Bonnie's Pictures	Yes	No	No	
1979	The Europeans	Yes	No	No	
1979	The Five Forty-Eight	Yes	No	No	TV film
1980	Jane Austen in Manhattan	Yes	No	No	
1981	Quartet	Yes	Uncredited	No	Co-screenwriter (with Ruth Prawer Jhabvala) (uncredited)
1983	Heat and Dust	Yes	No	No	
1984	The Bostonians	Yes	No	No	
1985	A Room with a View	Yes	No	No	
1985	American Playhouse	No	No	Executive	Episode: "Noon Wine"; Co-executive producer (with Ismail Merchant)
1987	Maurice	Yes	Yes	No	Co-screenwriter (with Kit Hesketh-Harvey)
1989	Slaves of New York	Yes	No	No	
1990	Mr. & Mrs. Bridge	Yes	No	No	
1992	Howards End	Yes	No	No	
1993	The Remains of the Day	Yes	No	No	
1995	Jefferson in Paris	Yes	No	No	
1995	Lumière and Company	Yes	No	No	Anthology film: co-director of Segment #31: Merchant Ivory/Paris (with Ismail Merchant)
1996	Surviving Picasso	Yes	No	No	
1998	A Soldier's Daughter Never Cries	Yes	Yes	No	Co-screenwriter (with Ruth Prawer Jhabvala)
2000	The Golden Bowl	Yes	No	No	
2003	Le Divorce	Yes	Yes	No	Co-screenwriter (with Ruth Prawer Jhabvala)
2005	The White Countess	Yes	No	No	
2005	Heights	No	No	Uncredited	Co-producer (with Ismail Merchant and Richard Hawley) (uncredited)
2009	The City of Your Final Destination	Yes	No	No	
2010	Arcadia Lost	No	No	Executive	
2017	Call Me by Your Name	No	Yes	Yes	Co-producer (with Émilie Georges, Luca Guadagnino, Marco Morabito, Howard Rosenman, Peter Spears and Rodrigo Teixeira)
2019	American Marriage	No	Collaboration	Executive	Short film Written in collaboration with Giorgio Arcelli Fontana
2022	A Cooler Climate	Yes	Yes	No	Documentary; Co-director (with Giles Gardner); Co-writer (with Giles Gardner)
2022	Chinese Laundry	No	No	Yes	Short film
2023	The Way It Was: Paris Restaurants in the 1970s	No	No	Executive	
2024	Merchant Ivory	No	No	Executive	Documentary; Also appears in the film as a subject as well as an interviewee
2026	Children of the Monkey	No	No	Executive	
2026	Her Song	No	No	Executive	Feature Film

=== Bibliography ===
- Ivory, James. Solid Ivory: Memoirs. New York: Farrar, Straus and Giroux, 2021. ISBN 978-0374601591
- --do.-- Autobiography of a Princess: also being the adventures of an American film director in the land of the maharajahs; screenplay by Ruth Prawer Jhabvala. London: John Murray, 1975 ISBN 0-7195-3289-2

== Awards and honours ==
In 1986 A Room with a View was nominated for eight Academy Awards, including Best Picture and Best Director, and won three, for Jhabvala's adaptation of Forster's novel as well as for Best Costume and Best Production Design. A Room With a View was also voted Best Film of the year by the Critic's Circle Film Section of Great Britain, the British Academy of Film and Television Arts, the National Board of Review in the United States and in Italy, where the film won the Donatello Prize for Best Foreign Language Picture and Best Director. In 1987, Maurice received a Silver Lion Award for Best Director at the Venice Film Festival as well as Best Film Score for Richard Robbins and Best Actor Awards for co-stars James Wilby and Hugh Grant. 1990's Mr. and Mrs. Bridge would receive an Oscar nomination for Best Actress (Joanne Woodward), as well as Best Actress and Best Screenplay from the New York Film Critics Circle.

In 1992 Ivory directed another film adapted from Forster, Howards End. The film was nominated for nine Academy Awards, including Best Picture and Best Director, and won three: Best Actress (Emma Thompson), Best Screenplay – Adaptation (Ruth Prawer Jhabvala), and Best Art Direction/Set Decoration (Luciana Arrighi/Ian Whittaker). The film also won Best Picture at the British Academy of Film and Television Arts (BAFTA) Awards, as well as awards for Best Picture, Best Actress for Emma Thompson and Best Director for Ivory from the National Board of Review. The Directors Guild of America awarded the D.W. Griffith award, its highest honor, to Ivory for his work. At the 1992 Cannes Film Festival the film won the 45th Anniversary Prize. Howards End was immediately followed by The Remains of the Day, which was nominated for eight Academy Awards, including Best Picture and Best Director.

For his work in Call Me by Your Name (2017), Ivory received an Academy Award for Best Adapted Screenplay, a Critics' Choice Movie Award for Best Adapted Screenplay, Writers Guild of America Award for Best Adapted Screenplay, BAFTA Award for Best Adapted Screenplay, and USC Scripter Award for Best Screenplay. He was also nominated for the AACTA International Award for Best Screenplay, and the Gotham Independent Film Award for Best Screenplay. At 89, Ivory is the oldest person to ever win an Academy Award in competition.

In 2022, Ivory was honored with Lifetime Achievement Award at the 17th Rome Film Festival.

== See also ==
- List of Academy Award records
- List of oldest and youngest Academy Award winners and nominees
- List of LGBTQ Academy Award winners and nominees
