= List of awards and nominations received by James Ivory =

James Ivory awards and nominations
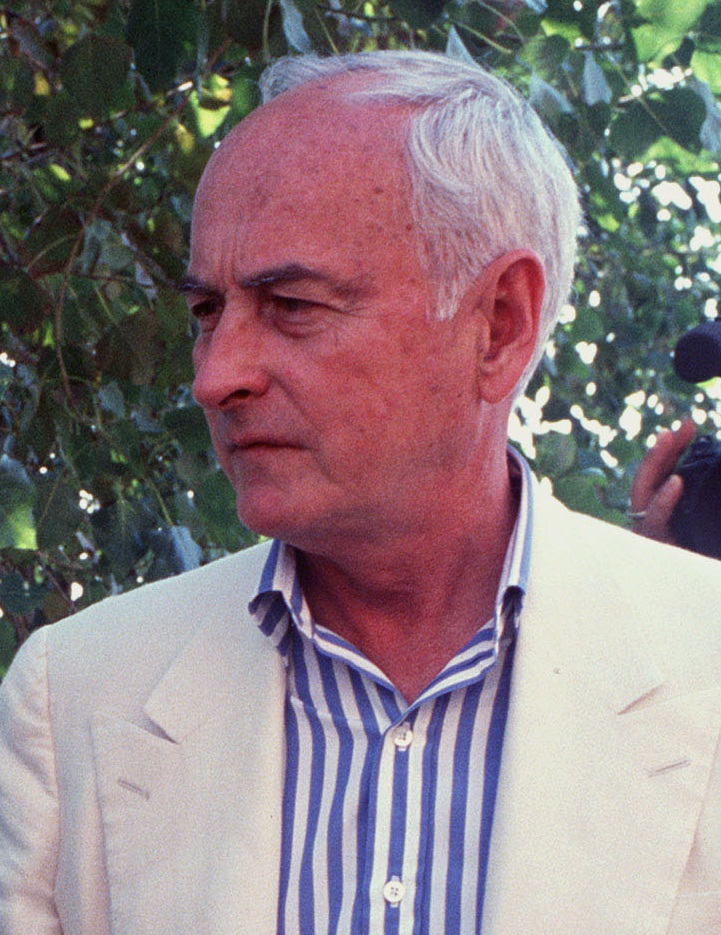
- Ivory in 1991
Award	Wins	Nominations
Academy Awards	1	4
British Academy Film Award	3	8
Golden Globe Awards	0	3
Cannes Film Festival	1	7

James Ivory is an American film director, producer, and writer known for his films under Merchant Ivory Productions. He has received numerous accolades including an Academy Award, three BAFTA Awards, and a Writers Guild of America Award as well as nominations for three Golden Globe Awards.

During his career he was nominated for the Academy Award for Best Director for A Room with a View (1985), Howards End (1992), and The Remains of the Day (1993). At the age of 89, Ivory made history when he went on to win the Academy Award for Best Adapted Screenplay for his work on Luca Guadagnino's Call Me by Your Name (2017). He received the Directors Guild of America Lifetime Achievement Award in 1995.

== Major associations ==
=== Academy Awards ===
Year	Category	Nominated work	Result	Ref.
1986	Best Director	A Room with a View	Nominated	
1992	Best Director	Howards End	Nominated	
1993	Best Director	The Remains of the Day	Nominated	
2017	Best Adapted Screenplay	Call Me by Your Name	Won	

=== BAFTA Awards ===
British Academy Film Awards
Year	Category	Nominated work	Result	Ref.
1983	Best Director	Heat and Dust	Nominated	
1986	Best Film	A Room with a View	Won	
1986	Best Director	A Room with a View	Nominated	
1992	Best Film	Howards End	Won	
1992	Best Director	Howards End	Nominated	
1993	Best Film	The Remains of the Day	Nominated	
1993	Best Director	The Remains of the Day	Nominated	
2017	Best Adapted Screenplay	Call Me by Your Name	Won	

=== Golden Globe Awards ===
Year	Category	Nominated work	Result	Ref.
1986	Best Director	A Room with a View	Nominated	
1992	Best Director	Howards End	Nominated	
1993	Best Director	The Remains of the Day	Nominated	

=== Independent Spirit Awards ===
Year	Category	Nominated work	Result	Ref.
1993	Best International Film	Howards End	Nominated	
2017	Best Feature	Call Me by Your Name	Nominated	

== Festival awards ==
=== Cannes Film Festival ===
Year	Category	Nominated work	Result	Ref.
1979	Palme d'Or	The Europeans	Nominated	
1981	Palme d'Or	Quartet	Nominated	
1983	Palme d'Or	Heat and Dust	Nominated	
1992	Palme d'Or	Howards End	Nominated	
1992	45th Anniversary Prize	Howards End	Won	
1995	Palme d'Or	Jefferson in Paris	Nominated	
2000	Palme d'Or	The Golden Bowl	Nominated	

== Guild awards ==
=== Directors Guild of America Award ===
Year	Category	Nominated work	Result	Ref.
1986	Best Director	A Room with a View	Nominated	
1992	Best Director	Howards End	Nominated	
1993	Best Director	The Remains of the Day	Nominated	
1995	Lifetime Achievement Award	—	Won	

=== Writers Guild of America Awards ===
Year	Category	Nominated work	Result	Ref.
2017	Best Adapted Screenplay	Call Me by Your Name	Won	

== Awards and nominations received by features directed by Ivory ==
Year	Title	Academy Awards		BAFTAs		Golden Globes	
Year	Title	Nominations	Wins	Nominations	Wins	Nominations	Wins
1972	Savages			1			
1977	Roseland					1	
1979	The Europeans	1		3		1	
1981	Quartet			1			
1983	Heat and Dust			8	1		
1984	The Bostonians	2		1		1	
1985	A Room with a View	8	3	14	5	3	1
1987	Maurice	1					
1990	Mr. and Mrs. Bridge	1				1	
1992	Howards End	9	3	11	2	4	1
1993	The Remains of the Day	8		6	1	5	
Total		30	6	45	9	16	2

Directed Academy Award performances by actors

Year	Performer	Title	Results
Best Actor
1994	Anthony Hopkins	The Remains of the Day	Nominated
Best Actress
1985	Vanessa Redgrave	The Bostonians	Nominated
1991	Joanne Woodward	Mr. and Mrs. Bridge	Nominated
1993	Emma Thompson	Howards End	Won
1994	Emma Thompson	The Remains of the Day	Nominated
Best Supporting Actor
1987	Denholm Elliott	A Room with a View	Nominated
Best Supporting Actress
1987	Maggie Smith	A Room with a View	Nominated
1993	Vanessa Redgrave	Howards End	Nominated
