= Sea & Us =

History

Marshall Islands
- Name: Sea & Us
- Owner: Anatoly Lomakin
- Builder: Amels Holland B.V.
- Yard number: 199#3
- Launched: 2018
- In service: 2018
- Identification: IMO number: 1012880; MMSI number: 538071277; Callsign: V7GY7

General characteristics
- Class & type: Motor yacht
- Tonnage: 1147 gross tons
- Length: 62.40 m (204.7 ft)
- Beam: 10.32 m (33.9 ft)
- Draught: 3.45 m (11.3 ft)
- Propulsion: twin 1500 kW Caterpillar 3512C engines
- Speed: 15 knots (28 km/h)
- Capacity: 12 guests
- Crew: 13

The 62.40 m (204.7 ft) superyacht Sea & Us was launched by Amels Holland B.V. at their yard in Vlissingen. She was designed by Tim Heywood, and the interior design was created by Winch Design. She has two sister ships, the 2013 built Event and the 2015-built Madame Kate.

The yacht, owned by Marshall Islands-registered company Pasithea Shipping Ltd., has been alleged by Russian opposition politician Alexei Navalny to be used by female journalist Nailya Asker-zade, a purported mistress of influential banker Andrey Kostin (best known as the head of state-owned VTB Bank).

== Design ==
Her length is 62.40 m (204.7 ft), beam is 10.32 m (33.9 ft) and she has a draught of 3.45 m (11.3 ft). The hull is built out of steel, while the superstructure is made out of aluminium with teak laid decks. The yacht is Lloyd's registered, issued by the Marshall Islands.

Some of the yacht's features include an enclosed lounge on the sun deck, a Touch & Go helicopter platform on the foredeck, and two folding balconies, as well as a large beach club. The Beach Club boasts a swim platform, retractable stairs, a Sauna, a steam shower, and Gym equipment.

She is powered by twin Caterpillar 3512C engines.

== See also ==
- List of motor yachts by length
- List of yachts built by Amels BV
