= The Portable Door =

2023 film by Jeffrey Walker

- Australian release poster
- Directed by: Jeffrey Walker
- Screenplay by: Leon Ford
- Based on: The Portable Door by Tom Holt
- Produced by: Blanca Lista; Todd Fellman
- Starring: Patrick Gibson; Sophie Wilde; Miranda Otto; Rachel House; Chris Pang; Jessica De Gouw; Damon Herriman; Sam Neill; Christoph Waltz
- Cinematography: Donald M. McAlpine
- Edited by: Geoff Lamb
- Music by: Benjamin Speed
- Production companies: Stan; Sky; MEP Capital; Arclight Films International; The Jim Henson Company; Story Bridge Films
- Distributed by: Madman Entertainment
- Release dates: 23 March 2023 (Australia); 8 April 2023 (United States)
- Running time: 116 minutes
- Country: Australia
- Language: English
- Box office: $801,082

The Portable Door is a 2023 Australian fantasy adventure comedy film directed by Jeffrey Walker and starring Patrick Gibson, Sophie Wilde, Sam Neill, and Christoph Waltz. The screenplay by Leon Ford is based on the 2003 novel of the same name, the first in Tom Holt's J. W. Wells & Co. series about the firm of "family sorcerers" introduced in Gilbert and Sullivan's The Sorcerer. A co-production between The Jim Henson Company and Story Bridge Films, the film was released theatrically in Australia on 23 March 2023 by Madman Entertainment, before streaming on Stan from 7 April 2023.

== Plot ==
Paul Carpenter and Sophie Pettingel are lowly, put-upon interns who begin working at the mysterious London firm J. W. Wells & Co., and become increasingly aware that their employers are anything but conventional. Charismatic villains Humphrey Wells, the CEO of the company, and middle manager Dennis Tanner are disrupting the world of magic by bringing modern corporate strategy to ancient magical practices, and Paul and Sophie discover the vast corporation's true agenda.

== Cast ==
- Patrick Gibson as Paul Carpenter
- Sophie Wilde as Sophie Pettingel
- Christoph Waltz as Humphrey Wells/John Wells Sr.
- Sam Neill as Dennis Tanner
- Miranda Otto as Countess Judy
- Rachel House as Nienke Van Spee
- Jessica De Gouw as Rosie Tanner
  - Tori Webb as Rosie Tanner in goblin form
- Chris Pang as Casimir
- Damon Herriman as Monty Smith-Gregg
- Christopher Sommers as Arthur Tanner
- Arka Das as Neville

== Production ==
In 2013, The Jim Henson Company and Story Bridge Films began developing the project.

In February 2020, Jeffrey Walker was announced to be directing the adaptation of the first book in Tom Holt's seven-part fantasy book series from a script written by Leon Ford with Christoph Waltz and Guy Pearce starring.

In May 2021, the cast was announced, including Waltz, Sam Neill (replacing Pearce), Patrick Gibson, Sophie Wilde, and Miranda Otto, with production scheduled to begin at Pinnacle Studios on the Gold Coast, Queensland.

The film was produced by Blanca Lista for The Jim Henson Company, and by Todd Fellman for Story Bridge Films.

== Release ==
The Portable Door was released theatrically in Australia on 23 March 2023 by Madman Entertainment. The film began streaming on 7 April 2023 in Australia on Stan and in the United Kingdom on Sky Cinema and Now, and the following day in the United States on MGM+.

== Reception ==
On the review aggregator website Rotten Tomatoes, the film holds an approval rating of 80% from critics based on 15 reviews.

== Accolades ==
Benjamin Speed's score won Feature Film Score of the Year at the 2023 Screen Music Awards in Australia.
