= Underneath My Skin =

Underneath My Skin may refer to:

- "Underneath My Skin", song by Christina Undhjem Denmark in the Eurovision Song Contest 2009
- "Underneath My Skin", song by In Flames from Battles (album)
- "Underneath My Skin", song by Jonathan Davis from Black Labyrinth 2018

== See also ==
- Under My Skin (disambiguation)
- Under the Skin (disambiguation)
