= Academic Exercises =

2014 collection of short stories by K. J. Parker

- Cover of first edition
- Author: K. J. Parker
- Cover artist: Vincent Chong
- Language: English
- Genre: Fantasy
- Publisher: Subterranean Press
- Publication date: 2014
- Publication place: United States
- Media type: print (hardcover), ebook
- Pages: 529
- ISBN: 978-1-59606-609-0
- OCLC: 870986762
- Followed by: The Father of Lies

Academic Exercises is a collection of fantasy short stories and essays by British writer Tom Holt, writing as K. J. Parker. It was the first of two Parker collections from Subterranean Press, and was first published in hardcover and ebook in July 2014.

== Summary ==
The book collects nine short works of fiction and three essays by the author.

== Contents ==
- "A Small Price to Pay for Birdsong" (from Subterranean Online, Winter 2011)
- "A Rich, Full Week" (from Swords & Dark Magic: The New Sword and Sorcery (June 2010))
- "Amor Vincit Omnia" (from Andromeda Spaceways Inflight Magazine #45, May 2010)
- "On Sieges" (essay) (from Subterranean Online, Summer 2009)
- "Let Maps to Others" (from Subterranean, Summer 2012)
- "A Room with a View" (from Subterranean: Tales of Dark Fantasy 2, April 2011)
- "Cutting Edge Technology" (essay) (from Subterranean Online, Fall 2011)
- "Illuminated" (from Andromeda Spaceways Inflight Magazine #55, December 2012)
- "Purple and Black" (originally published as Purple and Black (Subterranean Press, Jul. 2009))
- "Rich Men's Skins; A Social History of Armour" (essay) (from Subterranean, Summer 2013)
- "The Sun And I" (from Subterranean, Summer 2013)
- "One Little Room an Everywhere" (from Eclipse Online, October 22, 2012)
- "Blue and Gold" (originally published as Blue and Gold (Subterranean Press, Dec. 2010) )

== Reception ==
The collection was reviewed by Paul Di Filippo (2014) in Locus Online, Jul. 13, 2014, Gary K. Wolfe in Locus #643, August 2014, Gardner Dozois in Locus #644, September 2014, and Katherine Farmar in Strange Horizons, Oct. 27, 2014.

== Awards ==
The collection placed second in the 2015 Locus Poll Award for Best Collection.

- "A Small Price to Pay for Birdsong" won the 2012 World Fantasy Award for Best Novella and placed eighteenth in the 2012 Locus Poll Award for Best Novelette.
- "A Rich, Full Week" placed twenty-fourth in the 2011 Locus Poll Award for Best Novelette.
- "Amor Vincit Omnia" placed twentieth in the 2011 Locus Poll Award for Best Novelette.
- "Let Maps to Others" won the 2013 World Fantasy Award for Best Novella and placed ninth in the 2013 Locus Poll Award for Best Novella.
- "The Sun And I" was nominated for the 2014 World Fantasy Award for Best Novella and placed ninth in the 2014 Locus Poll Award for Best Novelette.
- "One Little Room an Everywhere" placed twenty-fourth in the 2013 Locus Poll Award for Best Novelette.
- "Blue and Gold" placed fourteenth in the 2012 Locus Poll Award for Best Novella.
