= Paint Your Dragon =

1996 novel by Tom Holt

- Author: Tom Holt
- Cover artist: Steve Lee
- Language: English
- Genre: Comedy;Fantasy
- Publisher: Orbit
- Publication date: 1996
- Publication place: United Kingdom
- Pages: 320
- ISBN: 1-85723-456-1
- Preceded by: My Hero
- Followed by: Open Sesame

Paint Your Dragon is a humorous novel by Tom Holt first published in the UK in 1996 by Orbit and in paper back a year later by St. Martin's Press. It was also made available in electronic format by Hachette Digital in 2009. This was the author's twelfth humorous book and his eighteenth overall. It has been republished as part of Tom Holt's Omnibus No'7: Saints and Sinners. Inspired by the legend of St. George and the Dragon, the book tells the story of a sculptor, Bianca Wilson, who creates statues of St. George and the Dragon. These statues come to life and carry on their battle where they left off. The story is intertwined with other minor plots that supplement the main theme and ultimately aid it to its conclusion.

== Synopsis ==
The story is set in a contemporary Britain to the date of writing. It seems to start as the classic Good versus Evil tale, but as the characters are developed, the reader finds this view challenged. George is portrayed as far from Saintly, the Dragon elicits sympathy. The notions of good and evil are portrayed as the bureaucracy and legislation found in Heaven and Hell. Alongside this, time itself has commercial value and can be mined, exploited and traded like any other commodity. When George finds he isn't winning he enlists the aid of some minor Demons, who are on a holiday from Hell and left behind after a stop in Nashville.

The Dragon was defeated in the original battle, but knows he was cheated by George and now wants to set the record straight. They carry on the battle by animating stolen statues. One of Holt's recurring characters from other novels makes an appearance in the form of Kurt Lindquist, an assassin. Various minor characters, such as clergymen who can't tell who side who is on, an animated statue of David and policemen that have the characteristics of the Keystone Cops.

The main protagonist, albeit reluctant, Bianca Wilson has been commissioned by Birmingham City Council. She isn't given any direction and by luck she produces a sculpture of St George and the Dragon backed by money from Kawaguchiya Integrated Circuits. One morning she finds the dragon has disappeared from her sculpture. Throughout the story Bianca displays a disinterest for getting involved in the dispute between George and the Dragon.

== Analysis ==
A common theme to reviews of Tom Holt's works are that his style is comparable to that of Robert Rankin or Terry Pratchett. The pace is fast and contains a lot of ideas within its twenty chapters.

Paul Pettengale reviewed Paint Your Dragon for Arcane magazine, rating it an 8 out of 10 overall, and stated that "His latest - which has the dragon from the 'Saint George and...' combo turn up on a Boeing at Heathrow in human guise, before 'abducting' the reptilian half of a new Saint George and the Dragon sculpture to be erected in the centre of Birmingham - is nothing new in terms of style. The jokes, however, are extremely fresh, because the comic element rests in the hilarious situations and the adopted manners of the characters, rather than trying to slot old gags into a new plot. Of course, if you're reading Tom Holt at all, you are probably not reading it in an attempt to uncover the plot intricacies and character interaction. Oh no, you're reading it to forget about your troubles and have a bloody good laugh. And, true to form, Holt does not disappoint with Paint Your Dragon. It really is quite superb."

Tom Knapp of online review site, Rambles, said:

"Paint Your Dragon is perhaps the most confusing of Holt's numerous novels, but don't assume that makes this any less of a dandy ride. Holt juggles dozens of characters and several diverging plot lines with mad abandon, maintaining throughout the book a wild, frenetic pace which makes it hard to put down. While he doesn't develop any of this book's characters to the same depth as his usual comedic and lore-saturated protagonists, he flings so many different characters into this one that they achieve an odd sort of shared depth."
