= J. W. Wells & Co. =

2003–2023 fantasy humor series

- The Portable Door; In Your Dreams; Earth, Air, Fire, and Custard; You Don't Have to Be Evil to Work Here, But It Helps; The Better Mousetrap; May Contain Traces of Magic; Life, Liberty, and the Pursuit of Sausages; The Eight Reindeer of the Apocalypse
- Author: Tom Holt
- Country: United Kingdom
- Language: English
- Genre: Fantasy, comedy
- Publisher: Orbit
- Media type: Print, ebook, audiobook
- No. of books: 8

J. W. Wells & Co. is a humorous fantasy series by British novelist Tom Holt. The series is inspired by the Gilbert and Sullivan opera The Sorcerer and follows the workforce of J. W. Wells & Co., a family-run magic firm.

As of 2023 there were eight novels in the series, the first of which was adapted as a film in 2023.

== Premise ==
The novels center around the workforce of J. W. Wells & Co., a family-owned magic firm in the City of London. The first three entries in the series focus on Paul Carpenter, a 20-something year old who takes a job at J. W. Wells & Co. He quickly discovers that the firm deals with the supernatural and magic. Paul also quickly becomes enamored of one of his office mates, Sophie. Later novels focus on other characters such as a real estate solicitor who finds herself dealing with strange occurrences.

== Books ==
=== The Portable Door (2003) ===
The novel follows Paul Carpenter, a college dropout whose parents have demanded that he take a job and sort out his life. He joins J. W. Wells & Co. as a filing clerk, despite a disastrous interview. Paul decides to stick with the job after meeting another new hire, Sophie, and falls for her despite her being in a relationship. As his time at the company continues Paul begins to realize that this is not an ordinary company, as strange occurrences and fantastical incidents abound. The novel was adapted as a feature film in 2023.

=== In Your Dreams (2004) ===
Paul is still a junior clerk at the firm, without knowing what the firm actually does. He is shocked to learn that J. W. Wells & Co. are one of the top six firms of family and commercial magicians in the UK, specialising in the entertainment and media, mining and mineral resources, construction, dispute resolution, applied sorcery and pest-control sectors. He immediately tries to resign, but the firm does not allow him to do so: his parents financed their early retirement to Florida in the US by selling him to the partners of J. W. Wells & Co., who wanted him because of the magical talent in family. He briefly finds true love with Sophie, the other junior clerk, shortly before she is abducted by Contessa Judy di Castel Bianco, the firm's entertainments and PR partner and hereditary Queen of the Fey, who permanently erases Sophie's feelings for Paul from her mind. He learns to scry for mineral deposits from Mr Tanner, who is half-goblin on his mother's side, and studies heroism and dragonslaying with Ricky Wurmtoter, the pest-control partner. He also picks up a little applied sorcery from the younger Mr Wells (before the elder Mr Wells turns him into a photocopier). Paul begins learning spatio-temporal displacement theory with Theodorus Van Spee, former professor of classical witchcraft at the University of Leiden and inventor of the portable folding parking-space. Paul dies twice (the second time in an accident) and is put on deposit for a while in the firm's account at the Bank of the Dead.

=== Earth, Air, Fire and Custard (2005) ===
Just as Paul believes that he has begun getting the hang of the work at J. W. Wells & Co., new issues arise.

=== You Don't Have to Be Evil to Work Here, But it Helps (2006) ===
The novel follows Colin, a disillusioned young man who works with his father in their family's failing widget business. He grows concerned when he learns that his father plans to bring in a new work force as part of a plan that he claims is foolproof, as Colin begins to suspect that it is anything but. Colin decides to reach out to his friend at J. W. Wells & Co. to see if there is anything they can do to prevent what he is sure will be disaster.

=== The Better Mousetrap (2008) ===
Emily Spitzer has a problem with her job. As a worker at a pest control company she is expected to deal with dragons who have taken control of bank vaults while also following an extensive amount of rules and regulations that require her to ensure that the creatures are not treated inhumanely. Despite the danger of her job, she ultimately dies while trying to rescue a kitten from a tree. Her death is undone by Frank Carpenter, the son of Paul and Sophie, who works for an insurance CEO and uses his portable door to reverse any event that would result in someone requesting a large insurance payout. He's successful in reversing her death, only for Emily to die again and again. They quickly surmise that someone wants Emily dead, forcing them to work together to ensure her continued survival.

=== May Contain Traces of Magic (2009) ===
The novel follows Chris Popham, who has run into an issue with his SatNav when it starts showing signs of sentience, upset that he never paid attention when it spoke.

=== Life, Liberty, and the Pursuit of Sausages (2011) ===
Subtitled A Comedy of Transdimensional Tomfoolery, the novel follows Polly, a real estate solicitor who is at the end of her rope. Strange things keep occurring around her. Her dry cleaner's has vanished, someone took her coffee and has been doing her work for her, and chickens have begun speaking.

=== The Eight Reindeer of the Apocalypse: A J. W. Wells Novel (2023) ===
A group of sorcerers working at Dawson, Ahriman & Dawson are stuck facing a crisis. The world is going to be destroyed by a comet, and the staff tries to figure out how to prevent this from occurring. Someone decides that the best option would be to hire Santa Claus, causing them to question if he really is the best person to prevent an apocalypse.

== Publication history ==
The series has been published in the United Kingdom through Orbit, starting in 2003, and in the United States beginning in 2004. An audiobook adaptation of The Portable Door narrated by Raymond Sawyer was released in 2004 through Isis Audio Books. Sawyer returned to narrate In Your Dreams and Earth, Air, Fire, and Custard.

== Film ==
A film adaptation of the first entry in the series, The Portable Door, was released theatrically in Australia on 23 March 2023, followed by a streaming release in April of the same year in Australia, the United Kingdom, and United States. The film was directed by Jeffrey Walker and starred Patrick Gibson, Sophie Wilde, Sam Neill, and Christoph Waltz. The film holds an approval rating of 81% on Rotten Tomatoes, based on 16 reviews, and the film's score won Feature Film Score of the Year at the 2023 Screen Music Awards.

== Reception ==
Holt's work has drawn comparisons to Terry Pratchett, a comparison that Rob Grant felt was likely due to the titles and some of the cover choices by the publisher, as "Holt's work tends to be grounded in ultra-ordinariness and set firmly on planet Earth, rather than on the back of giant turtles in space, before the majik and the runestones start flying." In a review for the second book, Jon Courtenay Grimwood stated that it was "Classic Holt, if not quite up there with his best, but punching all the right buttons and displaying an increasingly dark sense of the absurd." A reviewer wrote in SFRevu: "There is a good storyline, enjoyable characters and some twists and turns that left me amused and often bemused [but] this tale does not flow, the humour is average and the pace is somewhere between slow and steady".

A reviewer for The Roanoke Times noted that the sixth book, May Contain Traces of Magic, "will not suit all tastes, but those who enjoy dry British wit and improbable tales might find its unique flavor satisfying."
