= Madame Kate (yacht) =

History

Cayman Islands
- Name: Madame Kate
- Owner: Alexandre Bartelle
- Builder: Amels Holland B.V.
- Yard number: 199#2
- Launched: 2015
- In service: 2015
- Identification: IMO number: 1011654; MMSI number: 319077800; Callsign: ZGEQ7

General characteristics
- Class & type: Motor yacht
- Tonnage: 1140 gross tons
- Length: 62.40 m (204.7 ft)
- Beam: 10.32 m (33.9 ft)
- Draught: 3.45 m (11.3 ft)
- Propulsion: twin 1500 kW Caterpillar 3512C engines
- Speed: 13 knots (24 km/h)
- Capacity: 12 guests
- Crew: 13

The 62.40 m (204.7 ft) superyacht Madame Kate was launched by Amels Holland B.V. at their yard in Vlissingen. Laura Sessa, from Nuvolari Lenard, worked as designer for creating an interior that perfectly complements the theme of Tim Heywood's lines. She has two sister ships, the 2013 built Event and the 2018 built Sea & Us.

== Design ==
Her length is 62.40 m (204.7 ft), beam is 10.32 m (33.9 ft) and she has a draught of 3.45 m (11.3 ft). The hull is built out of steel while the superstructure is made out of aluminium with teak laid decks. The yacht is Lloyd's registered, issued by Cayman Islands.

Some of the yacht's features include an enclosed lounge on the sun deck, a Touch & Go helicopter platform on the foredeck, and two folding balconies, as well as a large beach club. The Beach Club boasts a swim platform, retractable stairs, a Sauna, a steam shower and Gym equipment.

== Engines ==
She is powered by twin Caterpillar 3512C engines.

== See also ==
- List of motor yachts by length
- List of yachts built by Amels BV
