= The Father of Lies (collection) =

2018 collection of short stories by K. J. Parker

- Cover of first edition
- Author: K. J. Parker
- Cover artist: Vincent Chong
- Language: English
- Genre: Fantasy
- Publisher: Subterranean Press
- Publication date: 2018
- Publication place: United States
- Media type: print (hardcover), ebook
- Pages: 541
- ISBN: 978-1-59606-852-0
- OCLC: 1006440969
- Preceded by: Academic Exercises

The Father of Lies is a collection of fantasy short stories by British writer Tom Holt, writing as K. J. Parker. It was the second of two Parker collections from Subterranean Press, and was first published in hardcover and ebook in January 2018.

== Summary ==
The book collects twelve short works of fiction by the author.

== Contents ==
- "The Things We Do for Love" (from Subterranean, Summer 2014)
- "Downfall of the Gods" (originally published as Downfall of the Gods (Subterranean Press, Mar. 2016))
- "The Last Witness" (originally published as The Last Witness (Tor.com, Oct. 2015))
- "The Devil You Know" (originally published as The Devil You Know (Tor.com, Mar. 2016)
- "I Met a Man Who Wasn't There" (from Subterranean, Winter 2014)
- "Heaven Thunders the Truth" (from Beneath Ceaseless Skies #157, Oct. 2, 2014)
- "Message in a Bottle" (from The Djinn Falls in Love & Other Stories (Solaris, Mar. 2017))
- "Rules" (first appearance)
- "Safe House" (from Fearsome Magics (Solaris, Oct. 2014))
- "The Dragonslayer of Merebarton" (from Fearsome Journeys (Solaris, May 2013))
- "Told by an Idiot" (from Beneath Ceaseless Skies #192, Feb. 4, 2016)
- "No Peace for the Wicked" (from Tales from the Vatican Vaults (Robinson, Aug. 2015))

== Reception ==
The collection was reviewed by Gary K. Wolfe in Locus #684, January 2018, Paul Di Filippo in Locus Online, Jan. 21, 2018, and Gardner Dozois in Locus #687, April 2018.

== Awards ==
The collection placed fifteenth in the 2019 Locus Poll Award for Best Collection.

"The Things We Do for Love" placed eighth in the 2015 Locus Poll Award for Best Novella.

"The Last Witness" placed fifteenth in the 2016 Locus Poll Award for Best Novella.

"The Devil You Know" placed twelfth in the 2017 Locus Poll Award for Best Novella.

"I Met a Man Who Wasn't There" placed eighth in the 2015 Locus Poll Award for Best Short Story.

"Heaven Thunders the Truth" placed twenty-eighth in the 2015 Locus Poll Award for Best Novelette.

"The Dragonslayer of Merebarton" placed thirtieth in the 2014 Locus Poll Award for Best Novelette.

"Told by an Idiot" placed twenty-second in the 2017 Locus Poll Award for Best Novelette.
