= Wish You Were Here (Holt novel) =

1998 novel by Tom Holt

- First edition
- Author: Tom Holt
- Genre: Humor, fiction
- Published: London: Orbit, 1998
- Media type: Book
- Pages: 252
- ISBN: 9781857235555
- OCLC: 39001561

Wish You Were Here is a humorous fantasy novel by English author Tom Holt. It was first published in the U.K by Orbit Books in 1998.

== Synopsis ==
A mischievous ghost tricks visitors into falling into Lake Chicopee, where — instead of drowning — they receive what they were wishing for at the time of their accident.

== Reception ==
At infinity plus, Nick Gifford stated that it had "super comic writing", which was reminiscent of Tom Sharpe, but faulted it for "mechanical" storytelling, with "protagonists (who) are too caricatured for any of their tribulations and transformations to really matter."
