= Monte Carlo (yacht) =

Superyacht

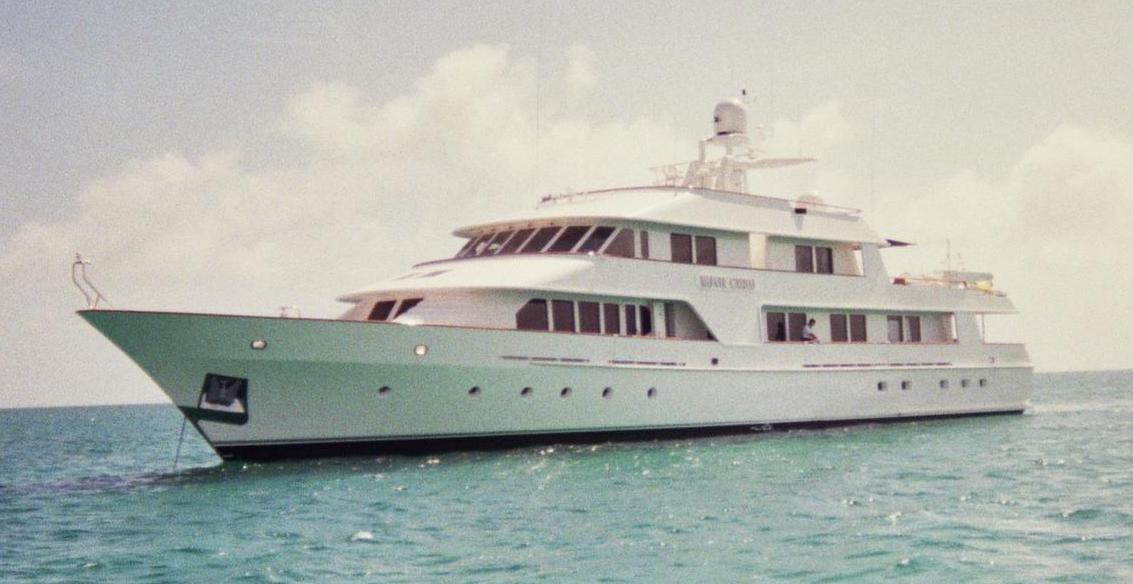
- Monte Carlo in the Bahamas, June 2005

History
- Name: Monte Carlo
- Port of registry: George Town, Cayman Islands
- Ordered: 1985
- Builder: Amels
- Laid down: 1985
- Launched: 1988
- Identification: IMO number: 8991267
- Status: In active service

General characteristics
- Tonnage: 358 GT
- Length: 40.4 m (132 ft 7 in)
- Beam: 8.3 m (27 ft 3 in)
- Draught: 2.4 m (7 ft 10 in)
- Decks: 4
- Installed power: 2 × 100 kW
- Propulsion: 2 × MTU 12V396TB diesel engines, two propellers, 2,924 kW (3,921 hp)
- Speed: 16 knots (30 km/h; 18 mph) cruising; 18 knots (33 km/h; 21 mph) maximum
- Capacity: 10 passengers (since 2014)
- Crew: 7-8 officers and crew
- Notes: Air Conditioning 30 tons Aqua-Air chillwater system

Monte Carlo is a motor yacht in the superyacht category. She was named after the Monte Carlo quarter of Monaco.

== History ==
Monte Carlo was built by Amels in their Hakvoort shipyard in The Netherlands and launched in 1988. She was designed by Diana Yacht Design BV. She underwent an extensive refit in 1999 (including an interior refit designed by Dee Robinson), and lesser refits in 2004 and 2006.

Monte Carlo currently cruises the Mediterranean Sea in the Summer cruising season, and the Caribbean in the Winter cruising season, crossing the Atlantic Ocean twice each year.

The vessel is powered by twin 1,550 hp MTU engines, and has a range of 4000 nautical miles at 10.8 knots.

== Notable passengers ==
- Pierce Brosnan, actor
- Mariah Carey, pop and R&B singer
