= Blonde Bombshell (novel) =

2010 novel by Tom Holt

- First edition (publ. Orbit Books)
- Author: Tom Holt
- Language: English
- Publication date: 2010

Blonde Bombshell is a 2010 humorous science fiction novel by British writer Tom Holt.

== Summary ==
A race of dogs on another planet decides to destroy Earth because humans were playing their music too loud.

== Reception ==
- Philip Cu-Unjieng of The Philippine Star states that with this novel, the writer "reinforces his status as one of the more off-beat, entertaining, comedic writers around."
- The Independent says it is "A fun, undemanding read which will put you in touch with your inner adolescent."
