= The Old Cannon Brewery =

Brewpub in Bury St. Edmunds, Suffolk, England

Coordinates: 52.2496°N 0.7147°E

- Interactive map of The Old Cannon Brewery
- Location: Bury St. Edmunds, Suffolk; United Kingdom
- Opened: 1999
- Owner: Independent

Active beers
Name	Type
Gunner's Daughter	English Pale Ale
Best Bitter	English Bitter
Blonde Bombshell	English IPA
Grape Shot	English Bitter
Powder Monkey	English mild
Black Pig	English Porter

The Old Cannon Brewery is a brewpub in Bury St Edmunds, Suffolk, UK. They have a roster of regular cask ales that are produced year round, as well as several popular seasonal beers that are produced at certain times of the year. It is one of two breweries in Bury St Edmunds, the other being the Greene King Brewery.

== History ==
This Victorian property was originally home to the Cannon Brewery, which closed during World War I. It was later home to a Greene King pub called The St Edmunds Head, which closed in the early 1990s. The St Edmundsbury Record Office shows Pat and Liz Spillane purchased the property from Greene King in 1994, renovated the buildings, and reopened as The Old Cannon Brewery in December 1999.

== Brewery ==
The seven barrel brewplant is situated in a room above the bar, by the bar and in the pub cellars.

== Products ==
The names of many of the beers maintain a British nautical theme. For example, The Gunners' Daughter is reference to the practice of disciplining sailors with a lashing received while leaning over the ship's cannons, known as 'kissing the Gunner's Daughter'. Powder Monkey is a term for the young boys who carried the gunpowder on the ships and Black Pig was a derogatory term for Spanish Galleons.
