= Friendzoned =

Single by JLC & Robin Bengtsson
- Released: 17 May 2019
- Recorded: 2018
- Genre: Pop
- Length: 3:15
- Label: Sony Music Entertainment
- Songwriter(s): Robin Bengtsson; Herman Gardarfve; Carl Deman; Lucas Simonsson; Jonas Fagerström
- Producer(s): Herman Gardarfve

Robin Bengtsson singles chronology
"Already Know" (2019)	"Friendzoned" (2019)	"Mama's Song" (2019)

"Friendzoned" is a song by JLC and Swedish singer Robin Bengtsson. It was released as a digital download in Sweden on 17 May 2019 by Sony Music Entertainment. The song was written by Robin Bengtsson, Herman Gardarfve, Carl Deman, Lucas Simonsson and Jonas Fagerström.

== Music video ==
A music video to accompany the release of "Friendzoned" was first released onto YouTube on 17 May 2019 at a total length of three minutes and twenty-six seconds.

== Track listing ==
Digital download
No.	Title	Length
1.	"Friendzoned"	3:15

== Charts ==
Chart (2019)	Peak position
Sweden (Sverigetopplistan)	24

== Certifications ==
Region	Certification	Certified units/sales
Sweden (GLF)	Gold	4,000,000^{†}
^{†} Streaming-only figures based on certification alone.

== Release date ==
Region	Date	Format	Label
Sweden	17 May 2019	Digital download; streaming	Sony Music Entertainment
