= Nothing But Blue Skies =

2001 novel by Tom Holt

- Author: Tom Holt
- Cover artist: Stephen Lee
- Language: English
- Genre: Fantasy novel
- Publisher: Orbit Books
- Publication date: 2001
- Publication place: United Kingdom
- Media type: Print (Hardback)
- ISBN: 1-84149-040-7
- OCLC: 45829787
- LC Class: PR6058.O474 N68 2001

Nothing But Blue Skies is a humorous fantasy novel by English author Tom Holt. It was first published in the UK by Orbit Books in 2001.

== Synopsis ==
Karen is a Chinese dragon with weather powers, who falls in love with a human and disguises herself as a human so that they can be together; when her father, the adjutant-general to the Dragon King of the North West, comes looking for her, things become much more complicated.

== Reception ==
In the Guardian, Jon Courtenay Grimwood declared that if readers "(e)xpect no logic from this book, (then) everything will be fine."
