= Here Comes The Sun (yacht) =

Cayman Islands luxury motor yacht launched in 2016

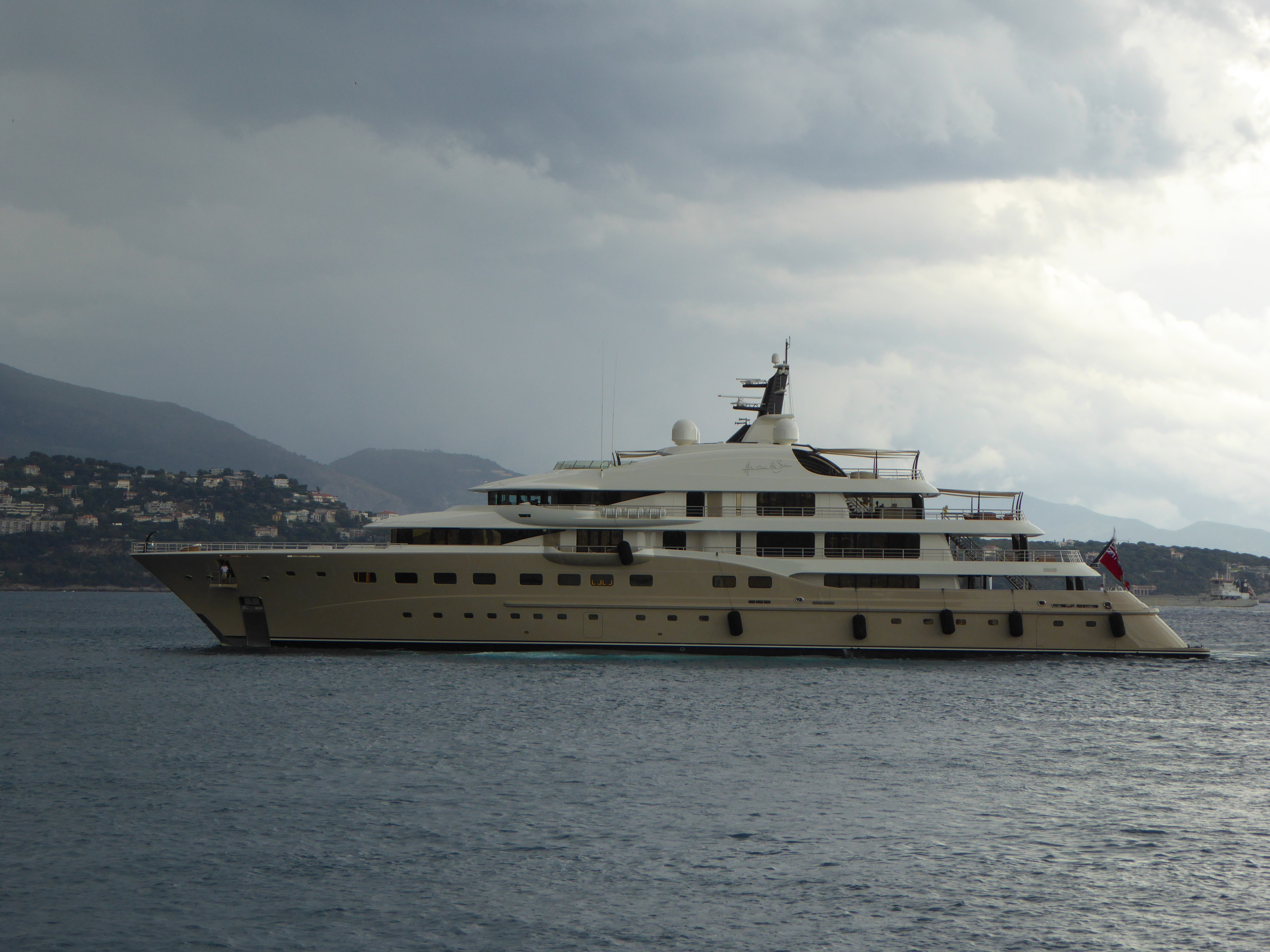

History

Cayman Islands
- Name: Here Comes The Sun
- Owner: Steve Wynn
- Builder: Amels Holland B.V.
- Yard number: 8301
- Launched: 2016
- In service: 2017
- Identification: IMO number: 1012414; MMSI number: 319105500; Callsign: ZGGA4

General characteristics
- Class & type: Motor yacht
- Tonnage: 2827 gross tons
- Length: 89 m (292 ft)
- Beam: 14.54 m (47.7 ft)
- Draught: 3.85 m (12.6 ft)
- Propulsion: twin 3150hp Caterpillar 3516 engines
- Speed: 17 knots (31 km/h)
- Capacity: 20 guests
- Crew: 27

The 89 m (292 ft) superyacht Here Comes The Sun was launched by Amels Holland B.V. at their yard in Vlissingen. The yacht’s exterior is the design work of Tim Heywood who is also behind the entire Amels Limited Editions range. Winch Design was selected by the owner to create the custom interior of Here Comes the Sun that flows across five decks. Originally built to 83m, 'Here Comes The Sun' underwent a six-month refit at Amels shipyard, completed in 2021, during which six metres was added to her length.

She is currently the largest yacht built by Amels.

She was owned by a New Zealand billionaire businessman Graeme Hart. The yacht was listed for sale in April 2023 for $195,000,000.

== Design ==
Her length is 89 m (292 ft), beam is 14.54 m (47.7 ft) and she has a draught of 3.85 m (12.6 ft). The hull is built out of steel while the superstructure is made out of aluminium with teak laid decks. The yacht is classed by Lloyd's Register and registered in the Cayman Islands. She is powered by twin Caterpillar 3516 engines, with a total power output 6300 hp.

== See also ==
- List of motor yachts by length
- List of yachts built by Amels BV
