= Tom Holt =

English novelist (born 1961)

- Born: 13 September 1961 (age 64); London, England
- Occupation: Writer
- Writing career
- Pen name: K. J. Parker
- Period: 1987–present
- Genres: Humorous fantasy, historical fiction

Thomas Charles Louis Holt (born 13 September 1961) is a British novelist. In addition to fiction published under his own name, he writes fantasy under the pseudonym K. J. Parker.

== Biography ==
Holt was born in London, the son of novelist Hazel Holt, and was educated at Westminster School, Wadham College, Oxford, and The College of Law, London. He worked as a solicitor in Somerset for seven years before writing full-time.

His works include mythopoeic novels which parody or take as their theme various aspects of mythology, history, or literature and develop them in new and often humorous ways. He has also written a number of historical novels writing as Thomas Holt. Steve Nallon collaborated with Holt to write I, Margaret, a satirical autobiography of Margaret Thatcher published in 1989.

== K. J. Parker ==
K. J. Parker is the pseudonym under which Holt has published fantasy fiction. Holt's assumed identity as K. J. Parker was kept secret for 17 years, until April 2015.

While Parker's stories take place in secondary worlds with fictional geographies and world history, some of the typical features of fantasy fiction such as explicit use of magic are not present in his novels. His short stories, on the other hand, frequently deal with magic and the problems it brings for sorcerers. The stories tend to have tragic themes with characters whose actions are unintentionally, ultimately self-destructive. Other major themes in the books are politics, technology (especially disruptive innovation), and either or both of the former as a means to power.

== Selected awards and nominations ==
Finalist for the Crawford Award for his first fantasy novel, Expecting Someone Taller.

Winner of World Fantasy Award—Novella in 2012 and 2013 for A Small Price to Pay for Birdsong and Let Maps to Other, and nominated in 2014. Nominated for the 2016 World Fantasy Award—Novel for Savages.

== Bibliography of Tom Holt ==
=== Novels ===
==== J.W. Wells & Co. ====
Featuring J.W. Wells & Co., the magic firm from The Sorcerer by Gilbert & Sullivan:

- The Portable Door (2003), which features office politics with a magical twist. Made into a film by The Jim Henson Company and Story Bridge Films in 2023.
- In Your Dreams (2004), in which the Fey use people's dreams to try to invade the world of humans.
- Earth, Air, Fire, and Custard (2005).
- You Don't Have to Be Evil to Work Here, But It Helps (2006).
- The Better Mousetrap (2008).
- May Contain Traces of Magic (2009), where a JWW travelling salesman breaks the rules and converses with his car's demonical navigation system.
- Life, Liberty, and the Pursuit of Sausages (2011), subtitled A Comedy of Transdimensional Tomfoolery, with a genius pig, human chickens, and reality misfunctions.
- The Eight Reindeer of the Apocalypse: A J. W. Wells Novel (2023)

==== YouSpace ====
Featuring YouSpace, a multiverse-based entertainment system, with doughnuts as portals:

- Doughnut (2013), a disgraced physicist is bequeathed a very strange legacy.
- When It's a Jar (2013), an ordinary fellow becomes a reluctant hero.
- The Outsorcerer's Apprentice (2014), a fairy tale universe is exploited economically.
- The Good, the Bad and the Smug (2015), Rumplestiltskin-based economies and Evil goes for a new, more appealing look.

==== Standalone humorous fantasy novels ====
- Expecting Someone Taller (1987), based on the mythology of Wagner's Der Ring des Nibelungen.
- Who's Afraid of Beowulf? (1988), based on Norse mythology and history.
- Flying Dutch (1991), based on the story of the Flying Dutchman.
- Ye Gods! (1992), based on elements of Greek mythology including a parody of Heracles.
- Overtime (1993), based on the legend of Blondel combined with time travel.
- Here Comes the Sun (1993), based loosely on the Celestial Bureaucracy reinterpreted along the lines of the British civil service.
- Grailblazers (1994), based on Arthurian romance and the quest for the Holy Grail.
- Faust Among Equals (1994), an imagined continuation of the story of Faust.
- Odds & Gods (1995), which features assorted pantheons and their adventures after "retirement".
- Djinn Rummy (1995), based on the antics of various bottle-trapped djinn along the lines of a modern Aladdin.
- My Hero (1996), in which literary characters can move between fiction and the real world. One of the main characters is Hamlet.
- Paint Your Dragon (1996), based on the adventures of statues carved to portray the legend of St George slaying the dragon.
- Open Sesame (1997), based on characters from the story of Ali Baba and the Forty Thieves.
- Wish You Were Here (1998), in which a lake spirit grants four people their heart's desire whether they like it or not.
- Only Human (1999), in which four human souls are switched respectively with a machine, a painting, a lemming and a demon.
- Snow White and the Seven Samurai (1999), based on fairy tales (Brothers Grimm and others) making a world within a computer simulation.
- Valhalla (2000), based on ideas from Norse mythology and the notion of tailoring an afterlife to suit the client.
- Nothing But Blue Skies (2001), which features Chinese dragons which cause rain, and the problems caused when one of them falls in love with a human.
- Falling Sideways (2002), which features human cloning and interference from a race of powerful alien frogs.
- Little People (2002), in which a boy sees elves, and discovers they are being shrunk, imprisoned and enslaved.
- Barking (2007), based on vampires and werewolves transposed into modern day legal firms.
- Blonde Bombshell (2010), an alien canine race is trying to destroy Earth.
- The Management Style of the Supreme Beings (2017), God and his oldest son Jay sell Earth to the Venturi brothers, leaving behind younger son Kevin, all the archangels, and Santa Claus.
- An Orc on the Wild Side (2019)

=== Historical ===
Using Thomas Holt as author name.

- The Walled Orchard (1997), originally published in two parts as Goatsong (1989) and The Walled Orchard (1990), all as by Tom Holt.
- Alexander at the World's End (1999)
- Olympiad (2000)
- A Song for Nero (2003)
- Meadowland (2005)

=== Other ===
- Poems by Tom Holt (1974) (Collection of early poems)
- continuations of E. F. Benson's "Lucia" series set in Tilling
  - Lucia in Wartime (1985) fiction
  - Lucia Triumphant (1986) fiction
- I, Margaret (1989) (satirical biography of Margaret Thatcher, with Steve Nallon)
- Bitter lemmings (1997) (Songbook)
- Holt Who Goes There? (2002) (short stories)
- Someone Like Me (2006).

=== Short fiction ===
- "They'd like to come and meet us, but they're only CGI". Andromeda Spaceways Inflight Magazine. 45: 77–100. 2010.

=== Parodies of musical works ===
- Impractical Man – a parody of the song Practical Man by Pete Atkin and Clive James.

== Bibliography of K. J. Parker ==
=== Novels ===
==== The Fencer trilogy ====
The Fencer trilogy follows Bardas Loredan, a fencer-at-law.

- Colours in the Steel (1998)
- The Belly of the Bow (1999)
- The Proof House (2000)

==== The Scavenger trilogy ====
The Scavenger trilogy is about a man, or possibly god, who wakes up on a battlefield with amnesia and discovers that he is being hunted by enemies he no longer remembers.

- Shadow (2001)
- Pattern (2002)
- Memory (2003)

==== The Engineer trilogy ====
The Engineer trilogy features an engineer, Ziani Vaatzes, who is forced into exile from his home city and plots an elaborate revenge.

- Devices and Desires (2005)
- Evil for Evil (2006)
- The Escapement (2007)

==== Siege ====
- Sixteen Ways to Defend a Walled City (9 April 2019)
- How to Rule an Empire and Get Away with It (18 August 2020)
- A Practical Guide to Conquering the World (11 January 2022)

==== The Corax trilogy ====
The titular character, Saevus Corax, is a battlefield salvage contractor fleeing from his responsibility as a member of a royal family, resulting in an "extended, bloody travelogue dotted with humor and snark".

- Saevus Corax Deals with the Dead (3 October 2023)
- Saevus Corax Captures the Castle (23 November 2023)
- Saevus Corax Gets Away With Murder (7 December 2023)

==== The Loyal Opposition Trilogy ====
- Sister Svangerd and the Not Quite Dead (27 January 2026)
- Sister Svangerd and the Devil You Know (12 May 2026)
- Sister Svangerd and the Chosen One (8 December 2026)

==== Other novels ====
- The Company (2 October 2008)
- The Folding Knife (22 February 2010)
- The Hammer (5 January 2011)
- Sharps (5 July 2012)
- The Two of Swords (April 2015), serialised e-book. Published in 2017 in three volumes:
  - Volume 1 Collects #1-8 (17 October 2017)
  - Volume 2 collects #9-15 (14 November 2017)
  - Volume 3 collects #16-19 (12 December 2017)
- Savages (31 July 2015)

=== Short fiction ===
==== Novellas ====
- Purple and Black. Subterranean Press. July 2009. Novella. Collected in Academic Exercises.
- Blue and Gold. Subterranean Press. December 2010. Novella. Collected in Academic Exercises.
- The Last Witness (6 October 2015) Novella. Collected in The Father of Lies.
- Downfall of the Gods. Subterranean Press. April 2016. Novella. Collected in The Father of Lies.
- The Devil You Know (1 March 2016) Novella. Collected in The Father of Lies.
- Mightier than the Sword. Subterranean Press. (30 May 2017). Collected in Under My Skin.
- My Beautiful Life. Subterranean Press. (30 November 2019). Collected in Under My Skin.
- Prosper's Demon. Tor.com. (28 January 2020). Collected in Under My Skin.
- The Big Score. Subterranean Press. (31 March 2021). Collected in Under My Skin.
- Inside Man. Tor.com. (15 June 2021).
- The Long Game (March 2022)
- Pulling the Wings Off Angels (15 November 2022)
- Burning Books for Pleasure and Profit. Tor.com. (22 December 2022)
- Relics. in: Under My Skin (31 March 2023)
- Set in Stone. Tor.com (4 September 2024)
- Making History. (September 2025)

Novelettes

- "The Best Man Wins". The Book of Swords. (10 October 2017). Collected in Under My Skin.
- "The Thought That Counts". Beneath Ceaseless Skies (250). April 2018. Collected in Under My Skin.
- "Portrait of the Artist". Beneath Ceaseless Skies (287). September 2019. Collected in Under My Skin.

==== Short stories ====
- "A Rich Full Week". Swords & Dark Magic: The New Sword and Sorcery. June 2010. Edited by Jonathan Strahan & Lou Anders. Collected in Academic Exercises.
- "A Room with a View". Subterranean: Tales of Dark Fantasy 2. April 2011. Edited by William Schafer. Collected in Academic Exercises.
- "One Little Room an Everywhere". Eclipse Online. October 2012. Collected in Academic Exercises.
- "The Dragonslayer of Merebarton". Fearsome Journeys. May 2013. Edited by Jonathan Strahan. Collected in The Father of Lies.
- "I Met a Man Who Wasn't There". Subterranean Online. January 2014. Collected in The Father of Lies.
- "The Things We Do For Love". Subterranean Online. Summer 2014. Collected in The Father of Lies.
- "Heaven Thunders The Truth". Beneath Ceaseless Skies (157). October 2014. Collected in The Father of Lies.
- "Safe House". Fearsome Magics. October 2014. edited by Jonathan Strahan. Collected in The Father of Lies.
- "Told by an Idiot". 4 February 2016. Collected in The Father of Lies.
- "Priest's Hole". Five Stories High. 1 December 2016.
- "Message in a Bottle". 14 March 2017. Collected in The Father of Lies.
- "Rules". The Father of Lies. 31 January 2018
- "The Return of the Pig". The Book of Magic. 16 October 2018. Collected in Under My Skin.
- "Many Mansions". Beneath Ceaseless Skies (313). September 2020. Collected in Under My Skin.
- "Habitat". The Book of Dragons. Harper Collins. 1 April 2021. Collected in Under My Skin.
- "Stronger". Beneath Ceaseless Skies (340). October 2021. Collected in Under My Skin.
- "Playing God". Beneath Ceaseless Skies (366). October 2022.
- "All love excelling". Under My Skin. 31 March 2023

==== Collections ====
- Academic Exercises (27 July 2014)
- The Father of Lies (31 January 2018)
- Under My Skin (31 March 2023)

=== Nonfiction ===
==== Short essays ====
- "On Sieges". Subterranean Online. Summer 2009. Collected in Academic Exercises.
- "Cutting Edge Technology: The Life and Sad Times of the Western Sword". Subterranean Online. Fall 2011. Collected in Academic Exercises.
- "Rich Men's Skins: A Social History of Armour". Subterranean Online. Summer 2013. Collected in Academic Exercises.

== Free short stories online ==
- "Amor Vincit Omnia". Subterranean Online. Summer 2010. Archived from the original on 31 July 2013.
- "A Small Price to Pay for Birdsong". Subterranean Online. Winter 2011. Archived from the original on 27 May 2013. Free short story online. (Winner of 2012 World Fantasy Award for best novella).
- "Let Maps to Others". Subterranean Online. Summer 2012. Archived from the original on 9 July 2012.
- "The Sun and I". Subterranean Online. Summer 2013. Archived from the original on 10 September 2014.
- "Illuminated". Subterranean Online. Summer 2013. Archived from the original on 11 September 2014.
