= Here Comes the Sun (Holt novel) =

1993 novel by Tom Holt

- First edition
- Author: Tom Holt
- Cover artist: Stephen Lee
- Language: English
- Genre: Fantasy novel
- Publisher: Orbit Books
- Publication date: 1993
- Publication place: United Kingdom
- Media type: Print (Hardback)
- Pages: 282 pp
- ISBN: 1-85723-125-2
- OCLC: 28674477

Here Comes the Sun is a 1993 science-fiction comedy novel by Tom Holt. The book was published in the UK by Orbit Books and is Holt's first comic science fiction novel.

== Plot ==
Mechanical failures begin to trouble the Sun, making it hard for its driver to complete his rounds. The sun is in need of maintenance, and other things are breaking down all over the universe. Fresh ideas are needed. Jane, a mortal and a management trainee, is brought in the sort it all.

== Reception ==
Critical reception for the novel was mixed, with SF Crowsnest praising Holt's dialogue, saying he has "the ability to make the reader laugh out loud and should be treasured".
