= The Bombshell =

2025 book

- Authors: Darrow Farr
- Language: English
- Genre: Historical fiction
- Publisher: Pamela Dorman Books
- Publication date: 27 May 2025
- Pages: 408
- ISBN: 9780593833247

The Bombshell is a 2025 historical fiction novel by Salvadoran-American author Darrow Farr.

== Themes ==
In an article for Literary Hub, Farr stated that the novel was inspired in part by the case of Patty Hearst, saying that "what has fascinated and inspired me since I was a teenager was the idea of Patty Hearst, the bogeyman she represented in the minds of Americans hungover from the radical ’60s. Here was a wealthy, educated young woman who would risk it all for a once-in-a-lifetime thrill, who was capable of denouncing her family’s bourgeois values and dedicating herself to the liberation of the oppressed. The protagonist of my novel is modeled off this myth."

== Critical reception ==
Allison Meakem of Foreign Policy wrote that the book was "full of explosive militant antics" and that "a large part of the book’s appeal is that the characters are young and hot and live near the beach." Writing in The New York Times, Violet Kupersmith described the novel as "effortlessly cool: a smart, sophisticated tale of sexual and political awakening over the course of a fateful summer that reads like falling into an Éric Rohmer film." Kirkus Reviews described the novel as a "passionate powder keg," saying that "too many obstacles are too easily overcome, but vibrant prose lends texture and urgency, while the fully fleshed characters’ increasingly thorny interpersonal relationships raise the story's stakes and give it soul." Nora Biette-Timmons of Jezebel also praised Farr for the atmosphere and setting of the novel, saying that it "heightens the romance of the novel."
