= Gillingwater =

Gillingwater is a surname. Notable people with the surname include:

- Claude Gillingwater (1870–1939), American actor
- Edmund Gillingwater (1736–1813), English antiquarian
- Michelle Gillingwater Pedersen (born 1987), Gibraltarian beauty queen, Miss Gibraltar 2011
- Richard Gillingwater (born 1956), British businessman
