= Pillar of salt =

Pillar of salt may refer to:

- The pillar of salt into which Lot's wife was transformed in the Biblical account of the destruction of Sodom and Gomorrah
- Pillar of Salt (road sign), a road sign in Bury St Edmunds, Suffolk, England, thought to be the first internally illuminated road sign in the country
- Pillar of Salt (film), a 1958 Hungarian film
- A Pillar of Salt, a 2021 album by Noah Gundersen
- "Pillar of Salt" (Fear the Walking Dead), a television episode
- The Pillar of Salt (La statue de sel), a 1953 novel by Albert Memmi
