= Bury St Edmunds =

Town in Suffolk, England

Coordinates: 52°14′45″N 0°42′45″E

- Town and civil parish
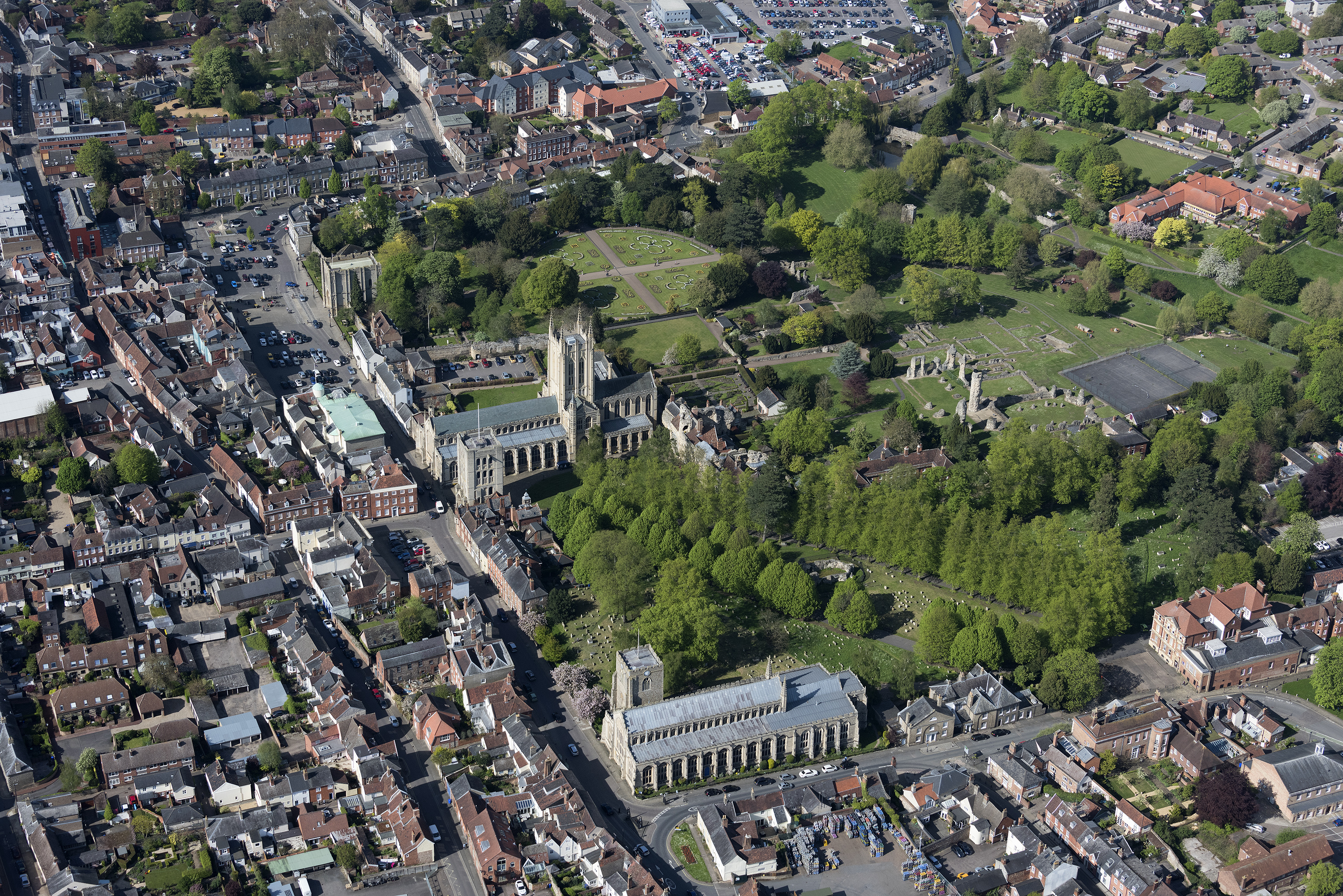
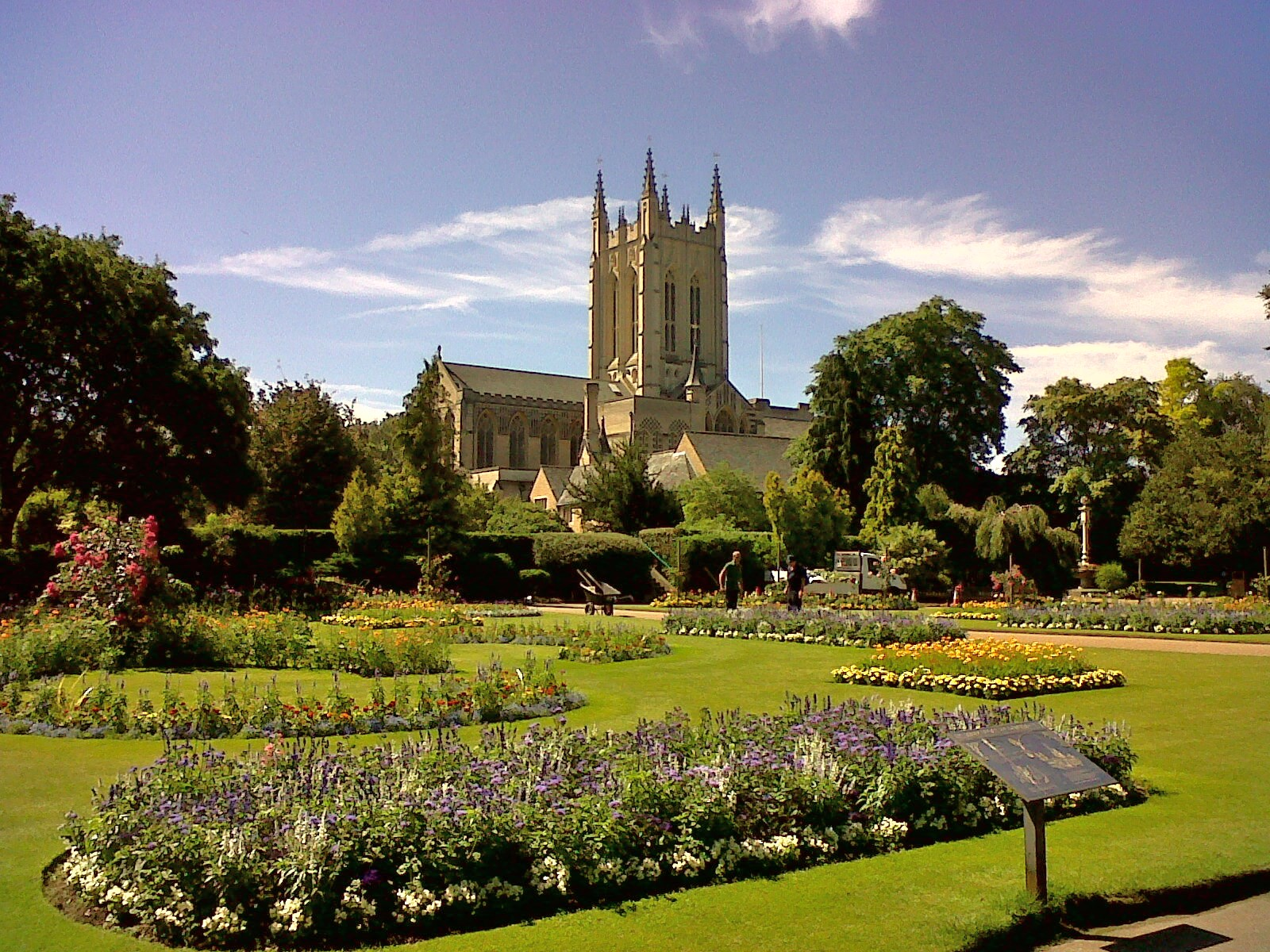
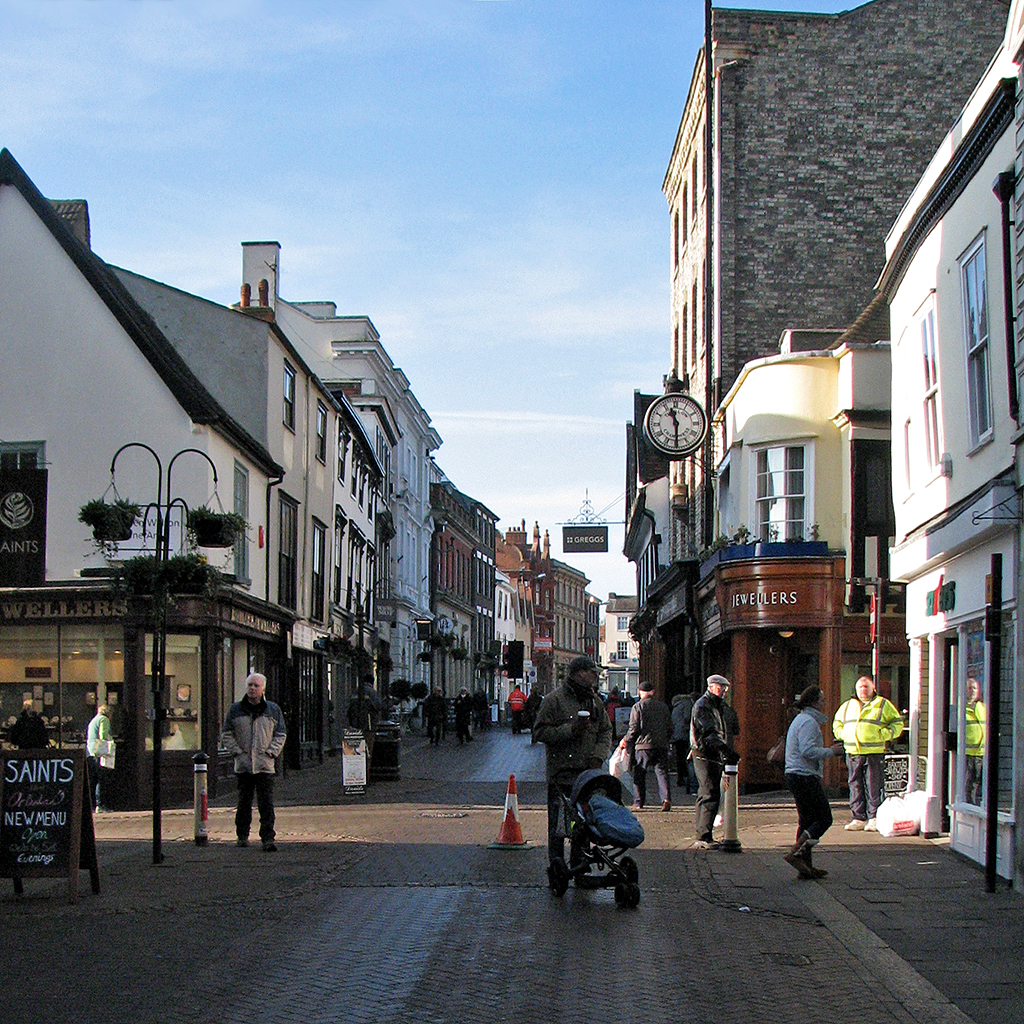
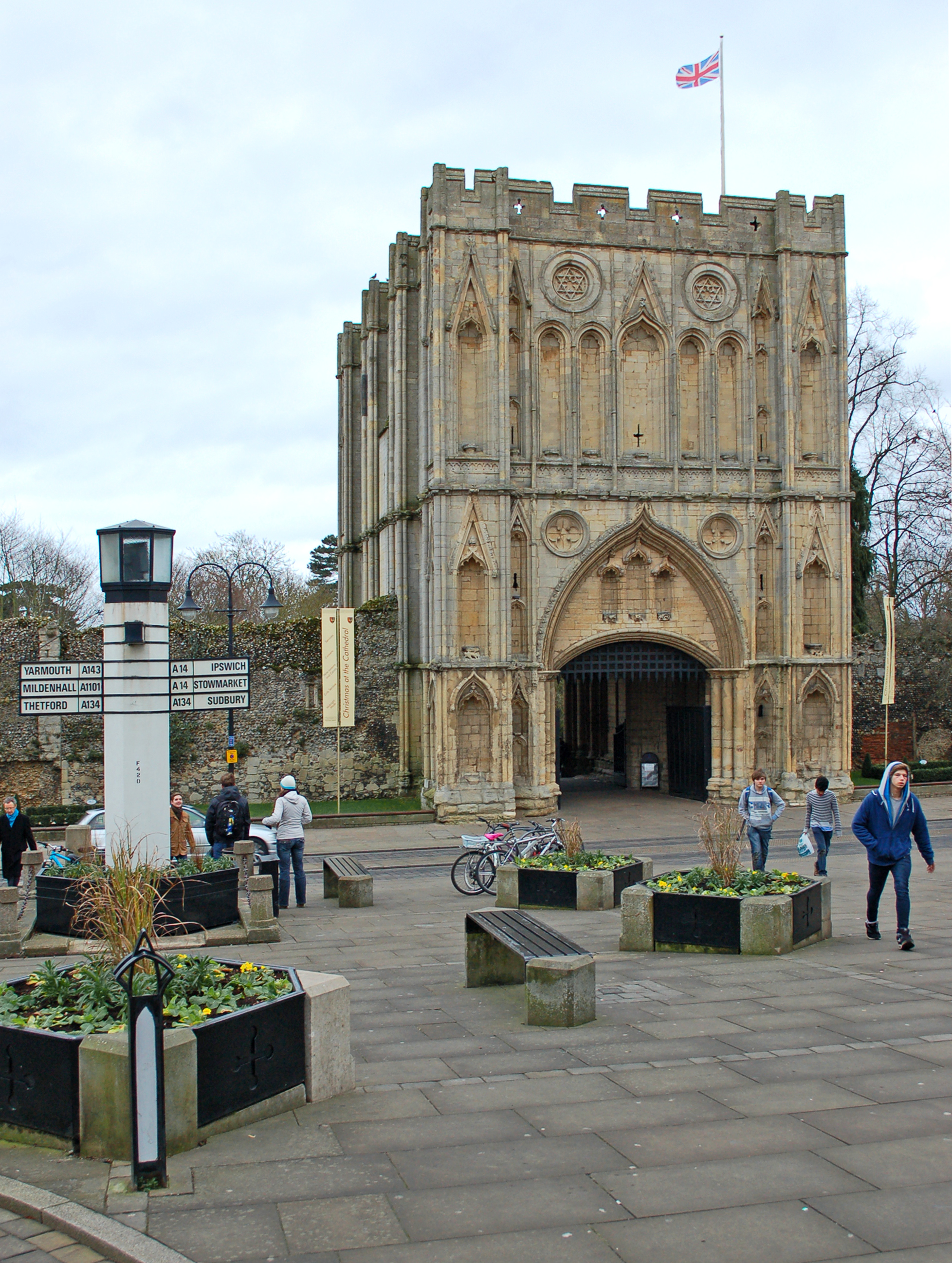
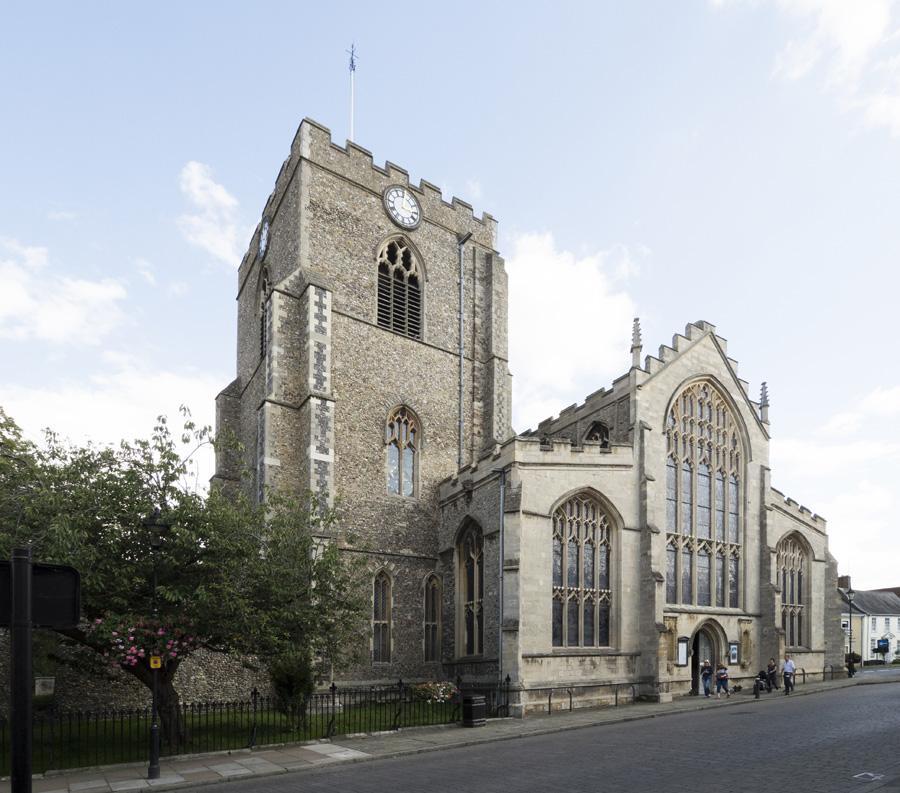
- Clockwise from top: Bury aerial view, Abbeygate Street, St Mary's Church, Abbeygate and Cathedral

- Location within Suffolk
- Population: 41,700 (Parish, 2022); 41,280 (Built up area, 2021)
- OS grid reference: TL855645
- Civil parish: Bury St Edmunds
- District: West Suffolk
- Shire county: Suffolk
- Region: East
- Country: England
- Sovereign state: United Kingdom
- Post town: BURY ST. EDMUNDS
- Postcode district: IP32, IP33
- Dialling code: 01284
- Police: Suffolk
- Fire: Suffolk
- Ambulance: East of England
- UK Parliament: Bury St Edmunds and Stowmarket

Bury St Edmunds (/ˈbɛri sənt ˈɛdməndz/), commonly referred to locally as Bury, is a cathedral town, market town and civil parish in the West Suffolk district, in the county of Suffolk, England. The town is best known for Bury St Edmunds Abbey and St Edmundsbury Cathedral.

Bury is the seat of the Diocese of St Edmundsbury and Ipswich of the Church of England, with the episcopal see at St Edmundsbury Cathedral. The town, originally called Beodericsworth, was built on a grid pattern by Abbot Baldwin around 1080. It is known for brewing and malting (Greene King brewery) and for a British Sugar processing factory, where Silver Spoon sugar is produced. The town is the cultural and retail centre for West Suffolk and tourism is a major part of the economy. The built up area had a population of 41,280 at the 2021 census.

== Etymology ==
The name Bury is etymologically connected with borough, which has cognates in other Germanic languages such as German Burg 'fortress, castle', Old Norse borg 'wall, castle', and Gothic baurg 'city'. They all derive from Proto-Germanic *burgs 'fortress'. This in turn derives from the Proto-Indo-European root *bhrgh 'fortified elevation', with cognates including Welsh bera 'stack' and Sanskrit bhrant- 'high, elevated building'. In Medieval Latin it was known as Burgum Sancti Edmundi (also spelled Aedmundi). In the Anglo-Saxon period the town was called Bedricesweord or Bedericesworth.

The second section of the name refers to Edmund, King of the East Angles, called Edmund the Martyr, who was killed by the Vikings in the year 869. He became venerated as a saint and a martyr, and his shrine made Bury St Edmunds an important place of pilgrimage.

The formal name of the diocese is "St Edmundsbury", and the town is colloquially known as Bury.

== History ==
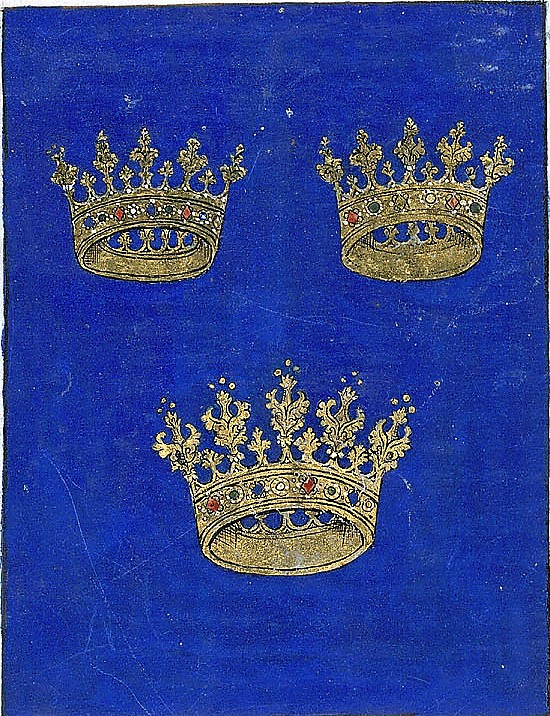
Illumination of the arms of Bury St Edmunds (British Library)

An archaeological study in the 2010s on the outskirts of Bury St Edmunds uncovered evidence of Bronze Age activity in the area. The dig also uncovered Roman coins from the first and second centuries. Samuel Lewis, writing in 1848, notes the earlier discovery of Roman antiquities, and as with several other writers connects Bury St Edmunds with Villa Faustini or Villa Faustina, although the location of this Roman site is also discussed by E. Gillingwater (1804), who notes the lack of evidence for it being here.

The town was one of the royal boroughs of the Saxons. Sigebert, king of the East Angles, founded Beodricesworth monastery here about 633, which in 924 became the burial place of King Edmund the Martyr, who was slain by the Danes in 869, and owed most of its early celebrity to the reputed miracles performed at the shrine of the martyr king. The town grew around Bury St Edmunds Abbey, a site of pilgrimage.

In 942 or 945, King Edmund I had granted to the abbot and convent jurisdiction over the whole town, free from all secular services, and Canute in 1020 freed it from episcopal control. Later, Edward the Confessor made the abbot lord of the franchise. The older monastery was destroyed and, the secular priests having been expelled, a new Benedictine abbey was built. Count Alan Rufus is said to have been interred at Bury St Edmunds Abbey in 1093. In the 12th and 13th centuries the head of the de Hastings family, who held the Lordship of the Manor of Ashill in Norfolk, was hereditary Steward of this abbey.

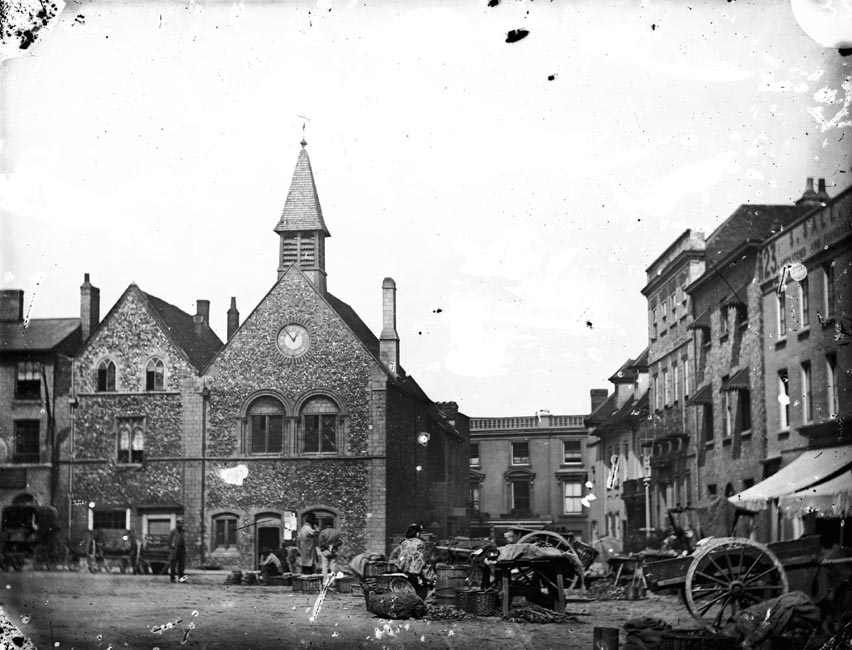
Early view of Moyse's Hall, today Moyse's Hall Museum

The town was for a time the home of a thriving Jewish community, and it is likely, although not certain, that Moyse's Hall belonged to a Jewish merchant. On 18 March 1190, two days after the more well-known massacre of Jews at Clifford Tower in York, the people of Bury St Edmunds massacred 57 Jews. Later that year, Abbot Samson successfully petitioned King Richard I for permission to evict the town's remaining Jewish inhabitants "on the grounds that everything in the town... belonged by right to St Edmund: therefore, either the Jews should be St Edmund's men or they should be banished from the town." This expulsion predates the Edict of Expulsion by 100 years. In 1198, a fire burned the shrine of St Edmund, leading to the inspection of his corpse by Abbot Samson and the translation of St Edmund's body to a new location in the abbey.

The town is associated with Magna Carta. In 1214 the barons of England are believed to have met in the abbey church and sworn to force King John to accept the Charter of Liberties, the document which influenced the creation of Magna Carta, a copy of which was displayed in the town's cathedral during the 2014 celebrations. By various grants from the abbots, the town gradually attained the rank of a borough.

Henry III in 1235 granted to the abbot two annual fairs, one in December and the other the great St Matthew's fair, which was abolished by the Fairs Act of 1871. In 1327, the Great Riot occurred, in which the local populace led an armed revolt against the abbey. The riot destroyed the main gate, and a new, fortified gate was built in its stead. On 11 April 1608 a great fire broke out in Eastgate Street, which resulted in 160 dwellings and 400 outhouses being destroyed.

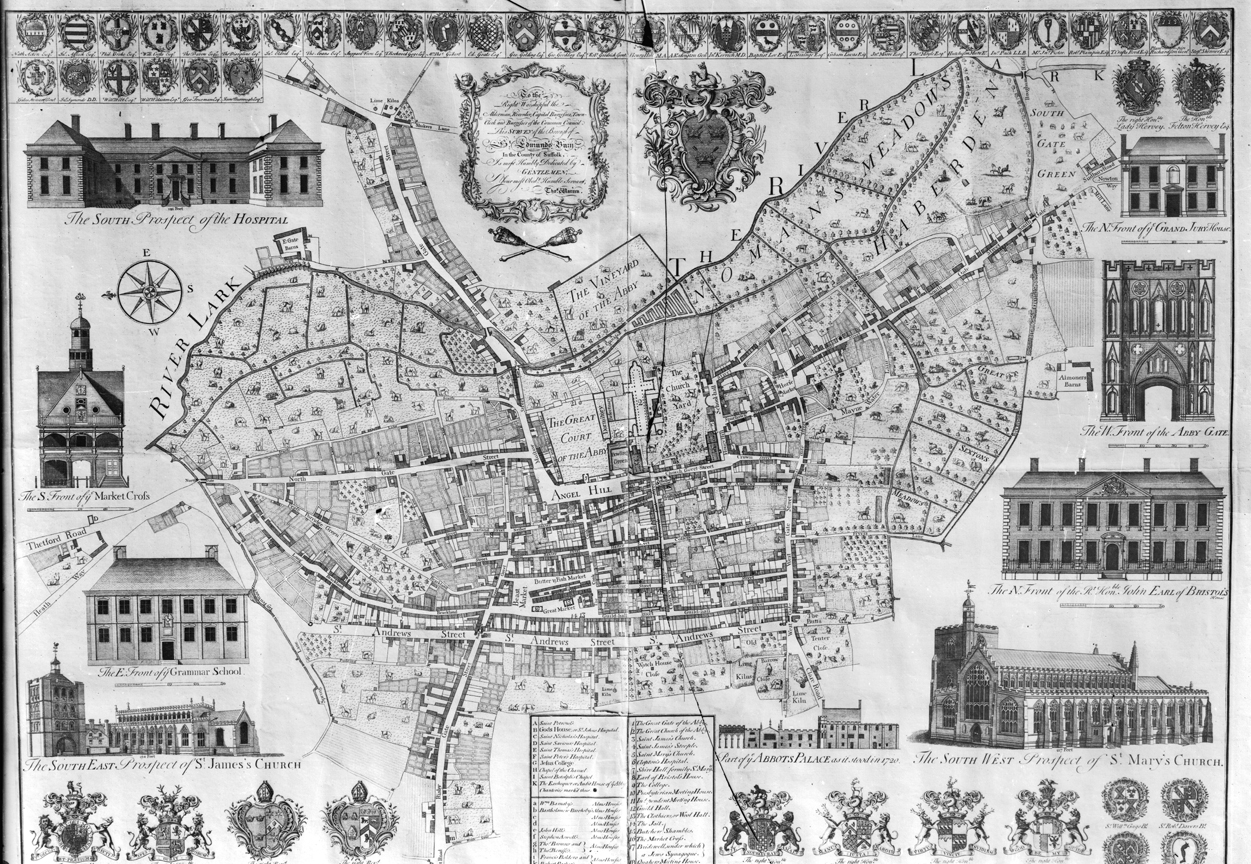
Thomas Warren's map of Bury St Edmunds, 1776

The town developed into a flourishing cloth-making town, with a large woollen trade, by the 14th century. In 1405 Henry IV granted another fair.

Elizabeth I in 1562 confirmed the charters which former kings had granted to the abbots. The reversion of the fairs and two markets on Wednesday and Saturday were granted by James I in fee farm to the corporation. James I in 1606 granted a charter of incorporation with an annual fair in Easter week and a market. James granted further charters in 1608 and 1614, as did Charles II in 1668 and 1684.

Parliaments were held in the borough in 1272, 1296 and 1446, but the borough was not represented until 1608, when James I conferred on it the privilege of sending two members. The Redistribution of Seats Act 1885 reduced the representation to one.

The borough of Bury St Edmunds and the surrounding area, like much of East Anglia, being part of the Eastern Association, supported Puritan sentiment during the first half of the 17th century. By 1640, several families had departed for the Massachusetts Bay Colony as part of the wave of emigration that occurred during the Great Migration. Bury's ancient grammar school also educated such notables as the puritan theologian Richard Sibbes, master of St Catherine's Hall in Cambridge, antiquary and politician Simonds d'Ewes, and John Winthrop the Younger, who became governor of Connecticut.

The town was the setting for witch trials between 1599 and 1694.

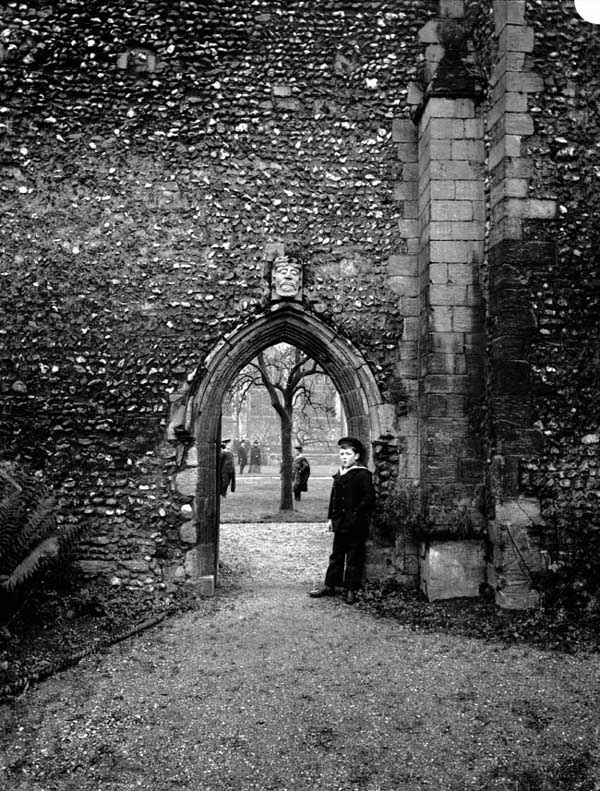
View of gate, Bury St Edmunds Abbey, c. 1920

=== Modern history ===
The population had reached 12,538 by 1841.

A permanent military presence was established in the town with the completion of the Militia Barracks in 1857 and of Gibraltar Barracks in 1878.

During the First World War, bombs twice fell on the town in Zeppelin raids, on the first occasion dropped by LZ38 in 1915 and on the second raid by L16 in 1916, when seven civilians were killed.

During the Second World War, the USAAF used Rougham Airfield outside the town.

On 3 March 1974 a Turkish Airlines DC10 jet Flight 981 crashed near Paris killing all 346 people on board. Among the victims were 17 members of Bury St Edmunds Rugby Football Club, returning from France.

== Notable features ==
Near the abbey gardens stands Britain's first internally illuminated street sign, the Pillar of Salt, which was built in 1935. The sign is at the terminus of the A1101, Great Britain's lowest road which is mostly below sea level.

There is a network of tunnels which are evidence of chalk-workings, though there is no evidence of extensive tunnels under the town centre. Some buildings have inter-communicating cellars. Due to their unsafe nature the chalk-workings are not open to the public, although viewing has been granted to individuals. Some have caused subsidence within living memory, for instance at Jacqueline Close.

Among noteworthy buildings is St Mary's Church, Bury St Edmunds, where Mary Tudor, Queen of France and sister of Tudor king Henry VIII, was re-buried, six years after her death, having been moved from the abbey after her brother's Dissolution of the Monasteries. Queen Victoria had a stained glass window fitted into the church to commemorate Mary's interment. Moreton Hall, a Grade II* listed building by Robert Adam, houses the now-closed Moreton Hall Preparatory School. Bury St Edmunds Guildhall dates back to the late 12th century.

Bury St Edmunds has one of the full-time fire stations run by Suffolk Fire and Rescue Service. Originally located in the Traverse (now the Halifax bank), it moved to Fornham Road in 1953. The Fornham Road site (now Mermaid Close) closed in 1987 and the fire station moved to its current location on Parkway North.

Since March 2015, Bury St Edmunds has been the home town of the London and South East Regional Divorce Unit and the Maintenance Enforcement Business Centre (for issues with maintenance payments outside Greater London). The former processes divorce documents from across London and South East England as one of five centralised units covering England and Wales. Both units are based with Bury St Edmunds County Court in Triton House, St Andrews Street North.

== Geography ==
Bury is located in the middle of an undulating area of East Anglia known as the East Anglian Heights, with land to the east and west of the town rising to above 100 metres (330 ft), though parts of the town itself are as low as 30 m (100 ft) above sea level where the Rivers Lark and Linnet pass through it.

=== Climate ===
There are two Met Office reporting stations in the vicinity of Bury St Edmunds, Brooms Barn (elevation 76 m or 249 ft), 6 1/2 miles (10 kilometres) west of the town centre, and Honington (elevation 51 m or 167 ft), about 6 1/2 mi (10 km) north. According to Usman Majeed, head of Honington, the latter ceased weather observations in 2003, while Brooms Barn remains operational. Brooms Barn's record maximum temperature stands at 38.1 °C (100.6 °F), recorded in July 2022. The lowest recent temperature was −10.0 °C (14.0 °F) during December 2010.

Rainfall is generally low, at just over 600 mm (24 in), and spread fairly evenly throughout the year.

Climate data for Brooms Barn, (Note: Weather station is located 6.0 miles (9.7 km) from the Bury St Edmunds town centre.) (1991–2020 normals, extremes 1964–present)
Month	Jan	Feb	Mar	Apr	May	Jun	Jul	Aug	Sep	Oct	Nov	Dec	Year
Record high °C (°F)	15.4 (59.7)	18.3 (64.9)	23.9 (75.0)	26.9 (80.4)	33.0 (91.4)	33.3 (91.9)	38.1 (100.6)	36.7 (98.1)	32.4 (90.3)	28.9 (84.0)	17.8 (64.0)	15.6 (60.1)	38.1 (100.6)
Mean daily maximum °C (°F)	7.1 (44.8)	7.7 (45.9)	10.5 (50.9)	13.8 (56.8)	17.0 (62.6)	19.9 (67.8)	22.6 (72.7)	22.3 (72.1)	19.1 (66.4)	14.7 (58.5)	10.3 (50.5)	7.5 (45.5)	14.4 (57.9)
Daily mean °C (°F)	4.5 (40.1)	4.8 (40.6)	6.9 (44.4)	9.3 (48.7)	12.3 (54.1)	15.2 (59.4)	17.7 (63.9)	17.5 (63.5)	14.9 (58.8)	11.3 (52.3)	7.5 (45.5)	4.9 (40.8)	10.6 (51.0)
Mean daily minimum °C (°F)	1.9 (35.4)	1.8 (35.2)	3.2 (37.8)	4.8 (40.6)	7.6 (45.7)	10.5 (50.9)	12.7 (54.9)	12.7 (54.9)	10.6 (51.1)	7.9 (46.2)	4.6 (40.3)	2.3 (36.1)	6.7 (44.1)
Record low °C (°F)	−12.5 (9.5)	−10.0 (14.0)	−10.0 (14.0)	−5.4 (22.3)	−1.3 (29.7)	0.2 (32.4)	3.9 (39.0)	5.0 (41.0)	0.6 (33.1)	−2.5 (27.5)	−7.5 (18.5)	−11.0 (12.2)	−12.5 (9.5)
Average precipitation mm (inches)	51.6 (2.03)	41.7 (1.64)	39.8 (1.57)	40.0 (1.57)	48.3 (1.90)	56.9 (2.24)	54.6 (2.15)	65.7 (2.59)	49.9 (1.96)	61.0 (2.40)	60.2 (2.37)	57.6 (2.27)	627.3 (24.70)
Average precipitation days (≥ 1.0 mm)	10.9	10.0	9.2	8.7	8.0	9.1	9.0	9.6	8.6	10.5	11.6	11.5	116.8
Mean monthly sunshine hours	62.2	76.4	121.3	170.5	207.6	198.1	208.1	194.6	152.4	114.5	70.0	57.5	1,633.2
Source 1: Met Office
Source 2: Starlings Roost Weather

== Religion ==
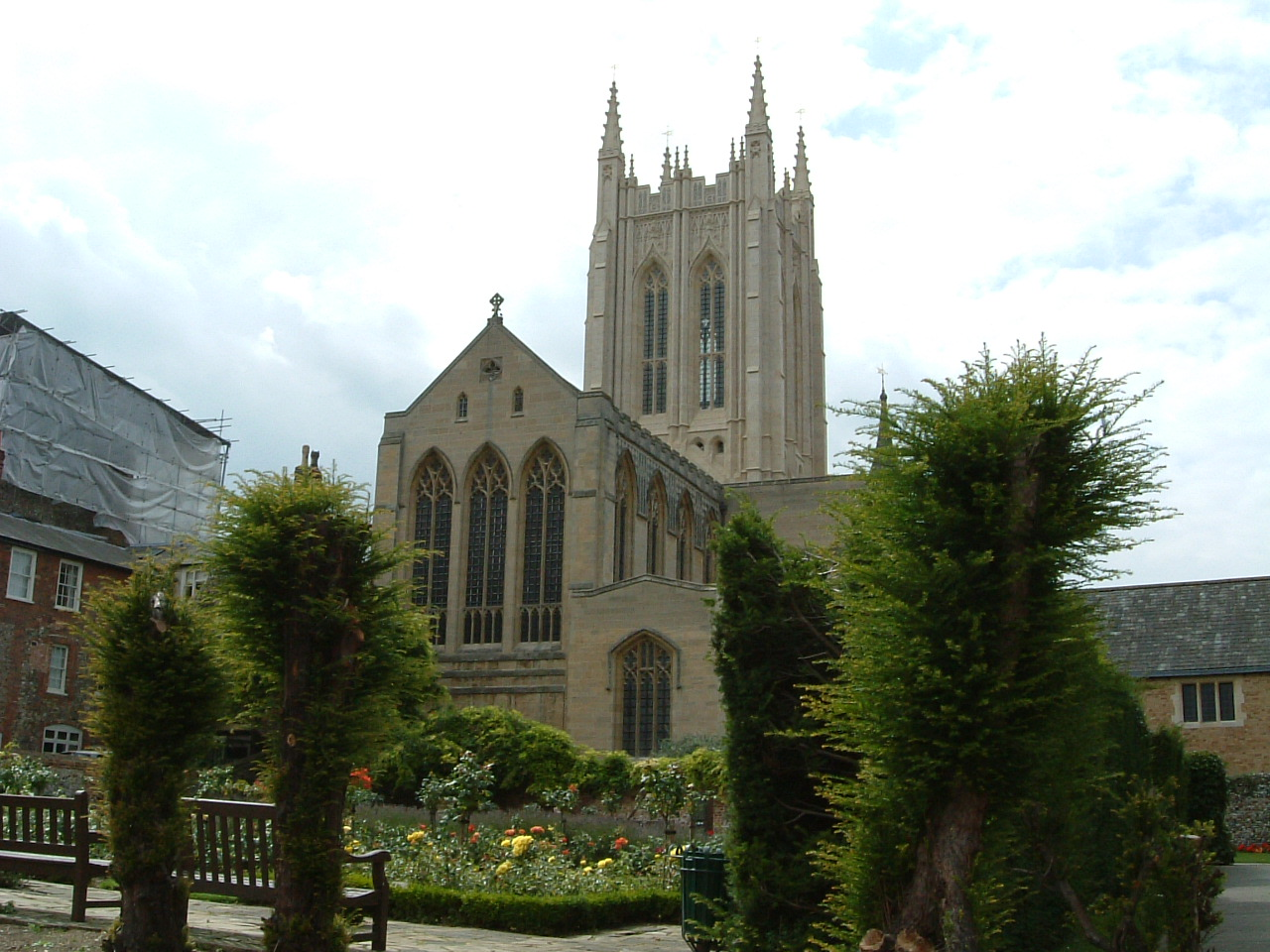
St Edmundsbury Cathedral from the east

The town has a Christian heritage dating back to the foundation of the abbey in 1020. Today there are many active churches in the town.

=== Abbey ===
In the centre of Bury St Edmunds lie the remains of an abbey, surrounded by the abbey gardens. The abbey is a shrine to Saint Edmund, the Saxon King of the East Angles. The abbey was sacked by the townspeople in the 14th century and then largely destroyed during the 16th century with the Dissolution of the Monasteries, but the town remained prosperous throughout the 17th and 18th centuries, only falling into relative decline with the Industrial Revolution.

=== Anglican Churches ===
Until the building of St John's in 1840, the town had just two parishes, St James's and St Mary's. The former has now become the cathedral. The town now has seven Anglican churches in six parishes, St Peter's being in the same parish as St Mary's.

==== Cathedral ====
St James' parish church became St Edmundsbury Cathedral when the Diocese of St Edmundsbury and Ipswich was formed in 1914. The cathedral was extended with an eastern end in the 1960s. A new Gothic revival cathedral tower was built as part of a Millennium project running from 2000 to 2005. The opening for the tower took place in July 2005, and included a brass band concert and fireworks. Parts of the cathedral remain uncompleted, including the cloisters. The tower makes St Edmundsbury the most recently completed Anglican cathedral in the UK, and was constructed using original fabrication techniques by six masons who placed the machine-cut stones individually as they arrived.

==== St Mary's Church ====
St Mary's Church is the civic church of Bury St Edmunds and the third largest parish church in England. It was part of the abbey complex and originally was one of three large churches in the town (the others being St James, now St Edmundsbury Cathedral, and St Margaret's, now gone). It is renowned for its magnificent hammer-beam "angel" roof, and is the final resting place of Mary Tudor, Queen of France, Duchess of Suffolk and favourite sister of Henry VIII. St Mary's is also home to the Chapel of the Suffolk and Royal Anglian Regiments.

The town has other Anglican churches:

- All Saints, Park Road; built 1953
- Christ Church, Moreton Hall; founded 1983, built 1993
- St George, Anselm Avenue; built 1951
- St John, St John's Street, built 1840
- St Peter, Hospital Road (district church; daughter church of St Mary's); built 1856-58

=== Non-Conformist Churches and chapels ===
- Baptist Church, Garland Street
- Beacon Church Bury St Edmunds, Oakes Road, an evangelical, charismatic and Pentecostal church; part of Assemblies of God in Great Britain
- Bridge Community Church, West Road, until September 2021 known as West Road Church; affiliated to the Evangelical Alliance
- Horringer Court Community Church, Glastonbury Road
- Kingsgate Church, Grove Road; affiliated to the Evangelical Alliance
- Evangelical Presbyterian Church, St Olaves Road
- Quaker Meeting House, St John's Street
- Seventh Day Adventist Church, Fornham Road, built as a Railway Mission "tin tabernacle"
- Southgate Church, Caie Walk
- Trinity Methodist Church, Brentgovel Street
- Unitarian Meeting House, Churchgate Street, built as Presbyterian Meeting House
- United Reformed Church, Whiting Street, formerly Congregational Church
- Westgate Chapel, Hospital Road, an independent evangelical church; affiliated to the FIEC
- West Suffolk Vineyard Church, Northern Way

=== Catholic church ===
St Edmund's Catholic Church, located in Westgate Street, is the Roman Catholic parish church of Bury St Edmunds. Founded by the Jesuits in 1763, the present church building is grade II listed. It was built in 1837. It is administered by the Diocese of East Anglia in its Bury St Edmunds deanery.

=== Former churches ===
Bury St Edmunds has several former church and chapel buildings:

- Methodist Chapel, 4A St Mary's Square (converted to residential)
- Rehoboth Strict Baptist Chapel, Out Westgate (now called Chapel House)
- Victory Congregational Chapel, Northgate Street (converted to commercial)
- Chapel, St Botolph's Lane (now called Old Mission House)

== Culture ==
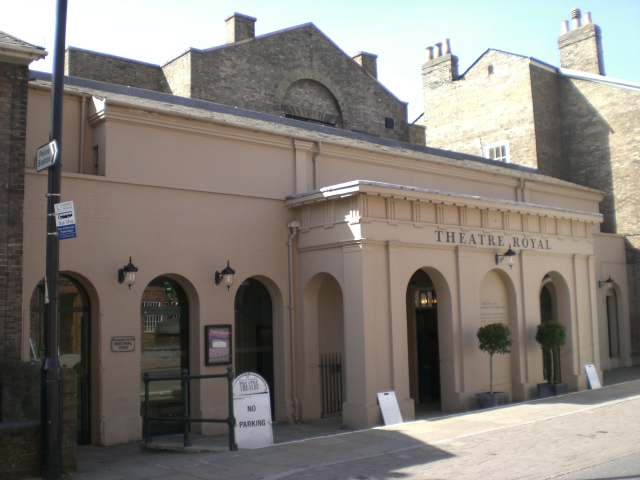
Theatre Royal, Bury St Edmunds exterior.

The Theatre Royal was built by National Gallery architect William Wilkins in 1819 and is the sole surviving Regency Theatre in the country. The theatre, owned by the Greene King brewery, is leased to the National Trust for a nominal charge, and underwent restoration between 2005 and 2007. It presents a full programme of performances and is also open for public tours. In August 2023, the Theatre Royal closed suddenly due to fire safety issues. An additional arts venue, The Apex, was built on the site of the former cattle market in 2010.

Moyse's Hall Museum is one of the oldest (c. 1180) domestic buildings in East Anglia open to the public. It has collections of fine art, for example Mary Beale, costume, e.g. Charles Frederick Worth, horology, local and social history, including Witchcraft. It holds an original death mask of William Corder who was hanged for the infamous 1827 Red Barn murder.

The Market Cross, today a community space, is a building restored by Robert Adam in 1780s. Between 1972 and 2018 the Market Cross was an art gallery called "Smiths Row", hosting a programme of changing contemporary art and craft exhibitions and events by British and international artists.

The town holds several festivals a year. The largest festival is held in May and includes concerts, plays, dance, and lecturers culminating in fireworks. There was an annual Christmas Fair in the town up until 2019, with food, drink, local crafts and fairground rides available, stretching from the Abbey Gardens to the Arc Shopping Centre. Bury St Edmunds is home to England's oldest Scout group, 1st Bury St Edmunds (Mayors Own).

=== Sport ===
The town's main football club, Bury Town, is the fourth oldest non-league team in England. They are members of the Isthmian League and have played at Ram Meadow since moving from Kings Road in the 1970s.

Suffolk County Cricket Club play occasional games at the Victory Ground, which is also the home ground of Bury St Edmunds Cricket Club. The cricket club previously played at Cemetry Road. Bury St Edmunds Rugby Football Club has an extensive history, including the devastating plane crash that killed several members who had attended a 1974 Five Nations Championship match. Eastgate Amateur Boxing club was established in 1981. The club has been headquartered at various locations in and around the town, but are now training in an old World War I gym in Rougham. West Suffolk Swimming Club formed in 1998 from the merger of two local swimming clubs and operates from pools in Bury St Edmunds, Haverhill and Culford. West Suffolk Athletics Club are based at the West Suffolk College sports ground.

Nowton Park hosts a parkrun every Saturday morning where runners, joggers and walkers can take part free-of-charge, supported by volunteers. A junior parkrun is held every Sunday morning at Ten Acre Field on the Moreton Hall estate, where 4-14 year olds can participate for free, cheered on by volunteers. A friendly running club called Bury St Edmunds Pacers welcomes runners of all abilities to join and holds regular running events.

=== Media ===
Local news and television programmes is provided by BBC East and ITV Anglia. Television signals are received from the Tacolneston TV transmitter and the local relay transmitter. The town's local radio stations are BBC Radio Suffolk on 104.6 FM, Heart East on 96.4 FM and RWSfm on 103.3 FM, a community radio station that broadcast from the town.

The local newspapers are the East Anglian Daily Times and Bury Free Press.

== Local economy ==
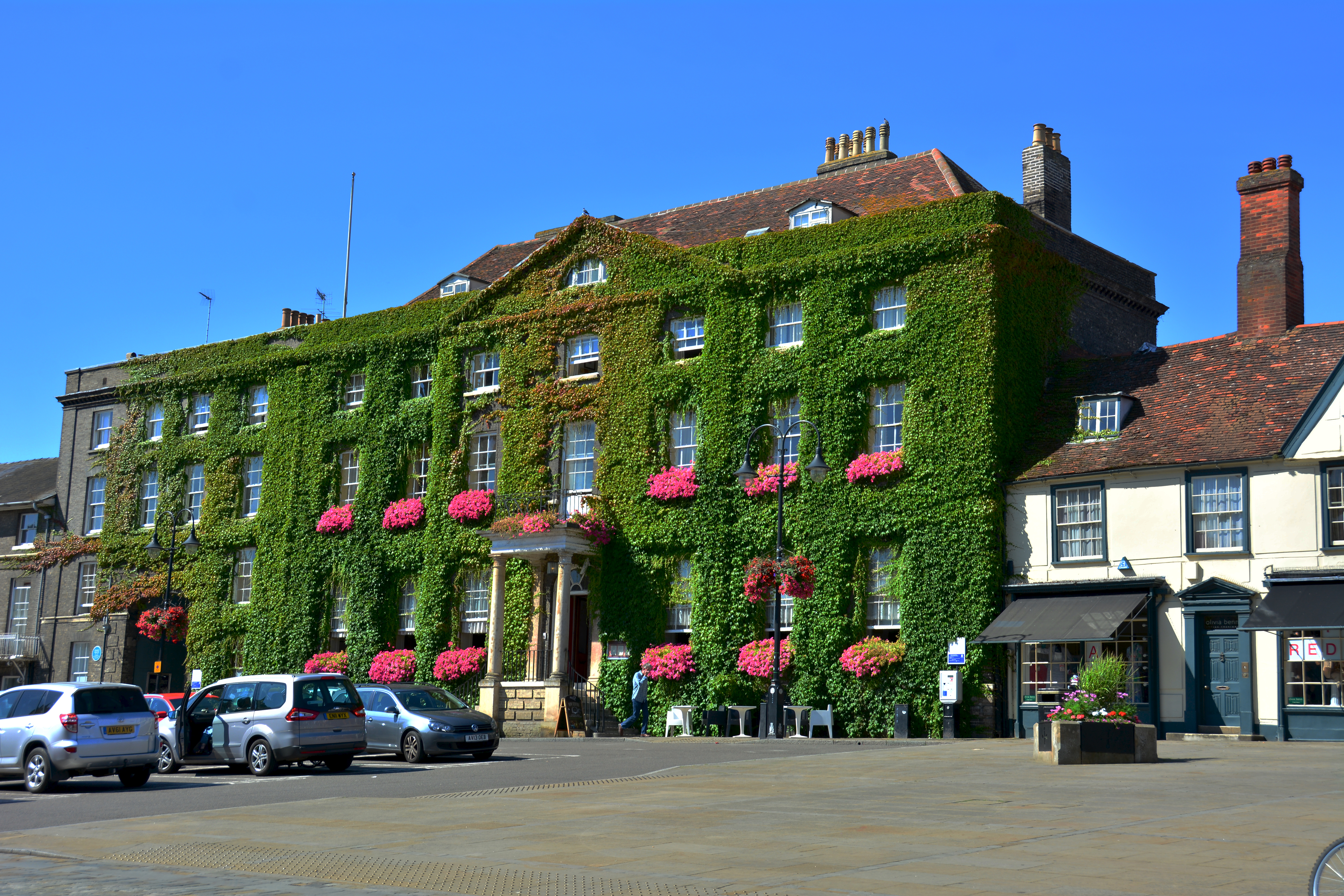
Angel Hotel located on Angel Hill

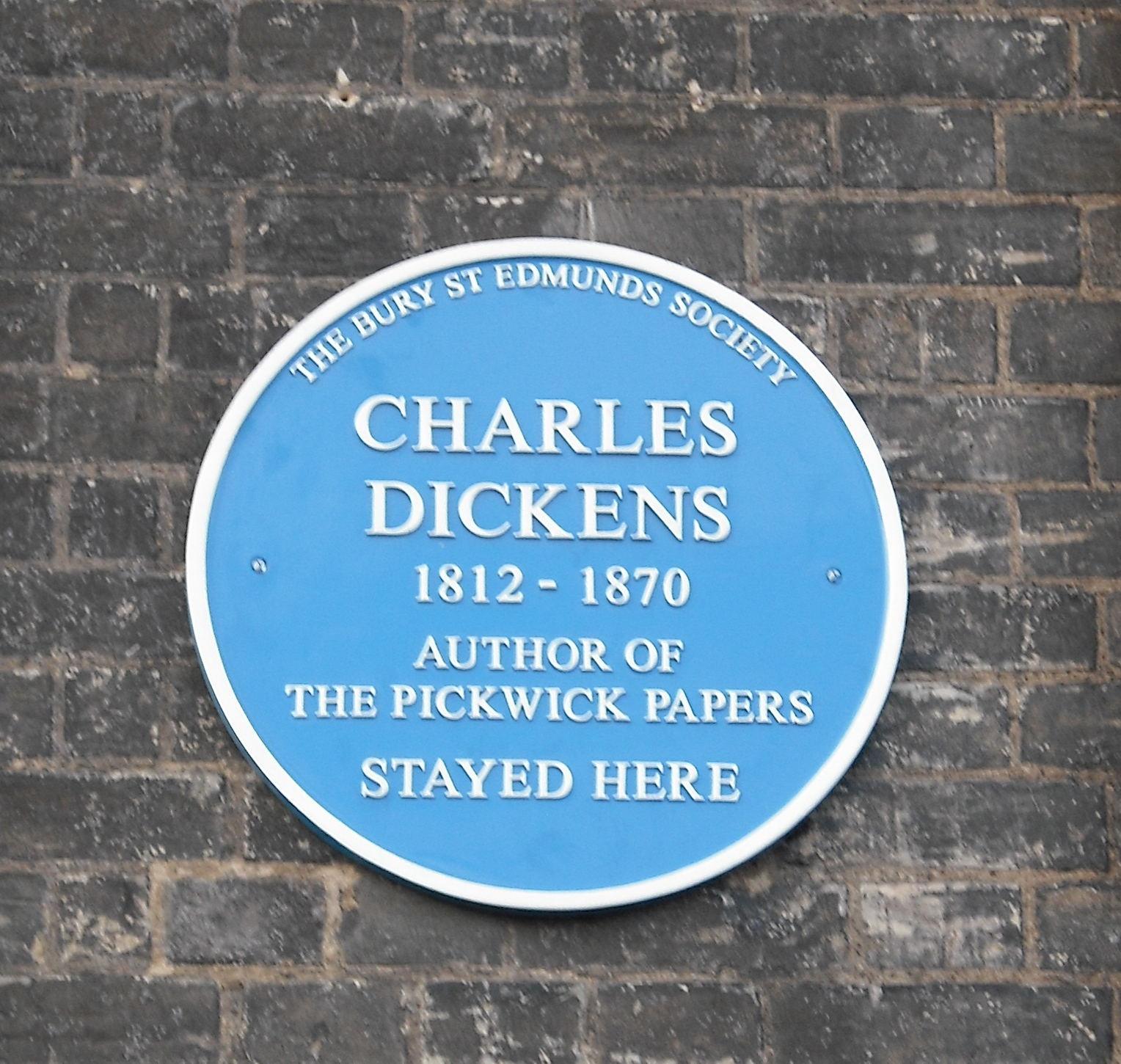
Dickens plaque at The Angel Hotel.

=== Tourism ===
The Angel Hotel is a Georgian building on Angel Hill. Charles Dickens stayed there while giving readings in the Athenaeum, as mentioned in The Pickwick Papers. Angelina Jolie stayed there while filming Tomb Raider. A coaching inn has existed on the site since the 15th century.

=== Brewing ===
Greene King, is situated in Bury St Edmunds, as is the smaller Old Cannon Brewery. Just outside the town, on the site of RAF Bury St Edmunds, is Bartrums Brewery, originally based in Thurston, and to the north is the Brewshed brewery, located in Ingham.

The Greene King pub The Nutshell is situated in the centre of the town, and is one of several that claim to be Britain's smallest public house. The Corn Exchange (Wetherspoons) is also located nearby.

=== Sugar beet ===
Bury's largest landmark is the British Sugar factory near the A14, which processes sugar beet into refined crystal sugar. It was built in 1925 when the town's MP, Walter Guinness, was Minister of Agriculture, and for many of its early years was managed by Martin Neumann, former manager of a sugar beet refinery in Šurany, then part of Czechoslovakia. Neumann was invited by the British government to oversee the refinement of sugar in Bury St Edmunds and, with his family, immigrated to the United Kingdom. The actor and writer Stephen Fry is a grandson of Martin Neumann, as recounted in the BBC programme Who Do You Think You Are?

The refinery processes beet from 1,300 growers. 660 lorry-loads of beet can be accepted each day when beet is being harvested. Not all the beet can be crystallised immediately, and some is kept in solution in holding tanks until late spring and early summer, when the plant has spare crystallising capacity. The sugar is sold under the Silver Spoon name (the other major British brand, Tate & Lyle, is made from imported sugar cane). By-products include molassed sugar beet feed for cattle and LimeX70, a soil improver. The factory has its own power station, which powers around 110,000 homes. A smell of burnt starch from the plant is noticeable on some days.

== Governance ==
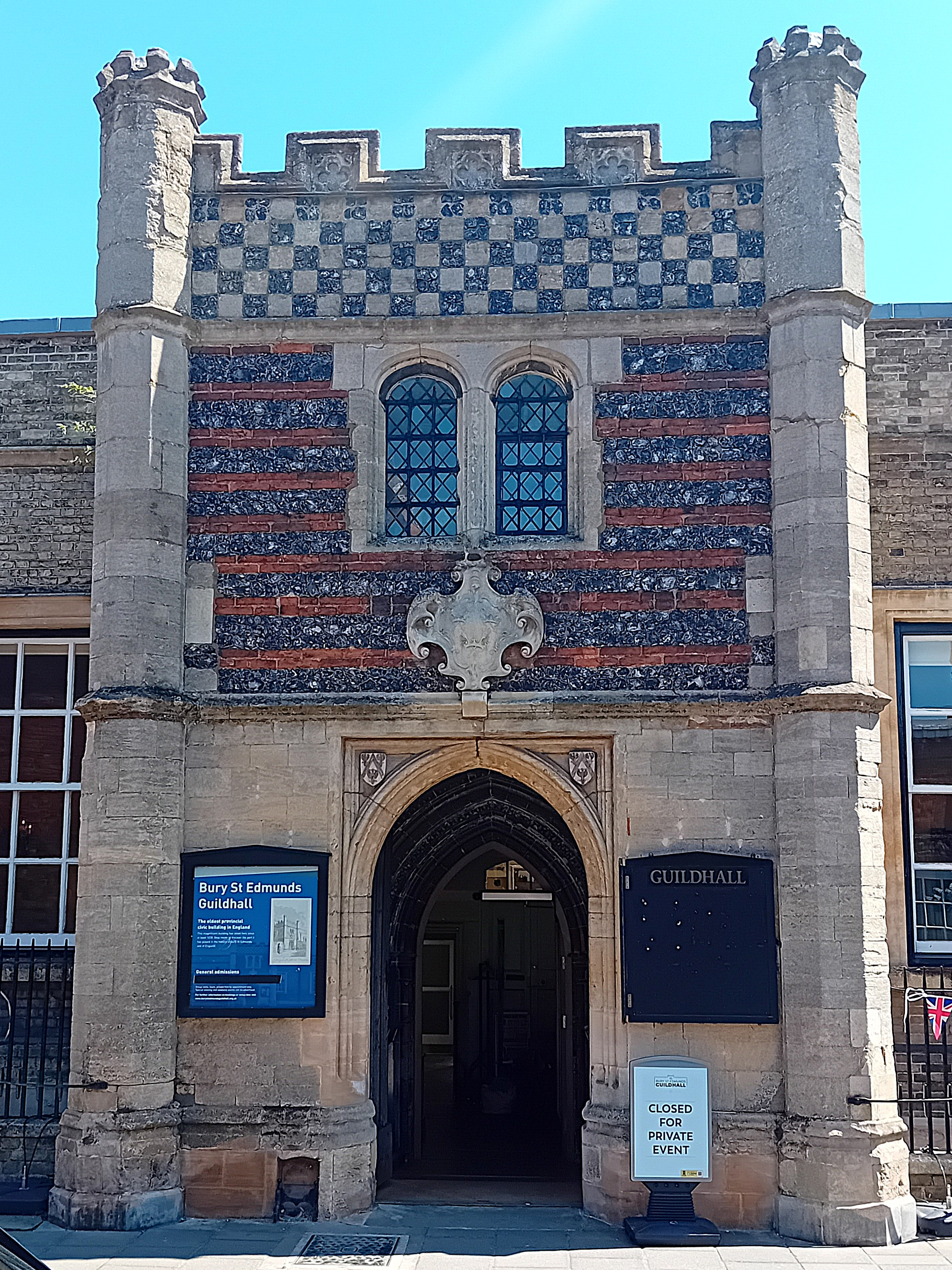
The Guildhall

There are three tiers of local government covering Bury St Edmunds, at parish (town), district, and county level: Bury St Edmunds Town Council, West Suffolk Council and Suffolk County Council. The town council meets at Bury St Edmunds Guildhall, parts of which date back to the 13th century, and has its offices in an adjoining building at 79 Whiting Street.

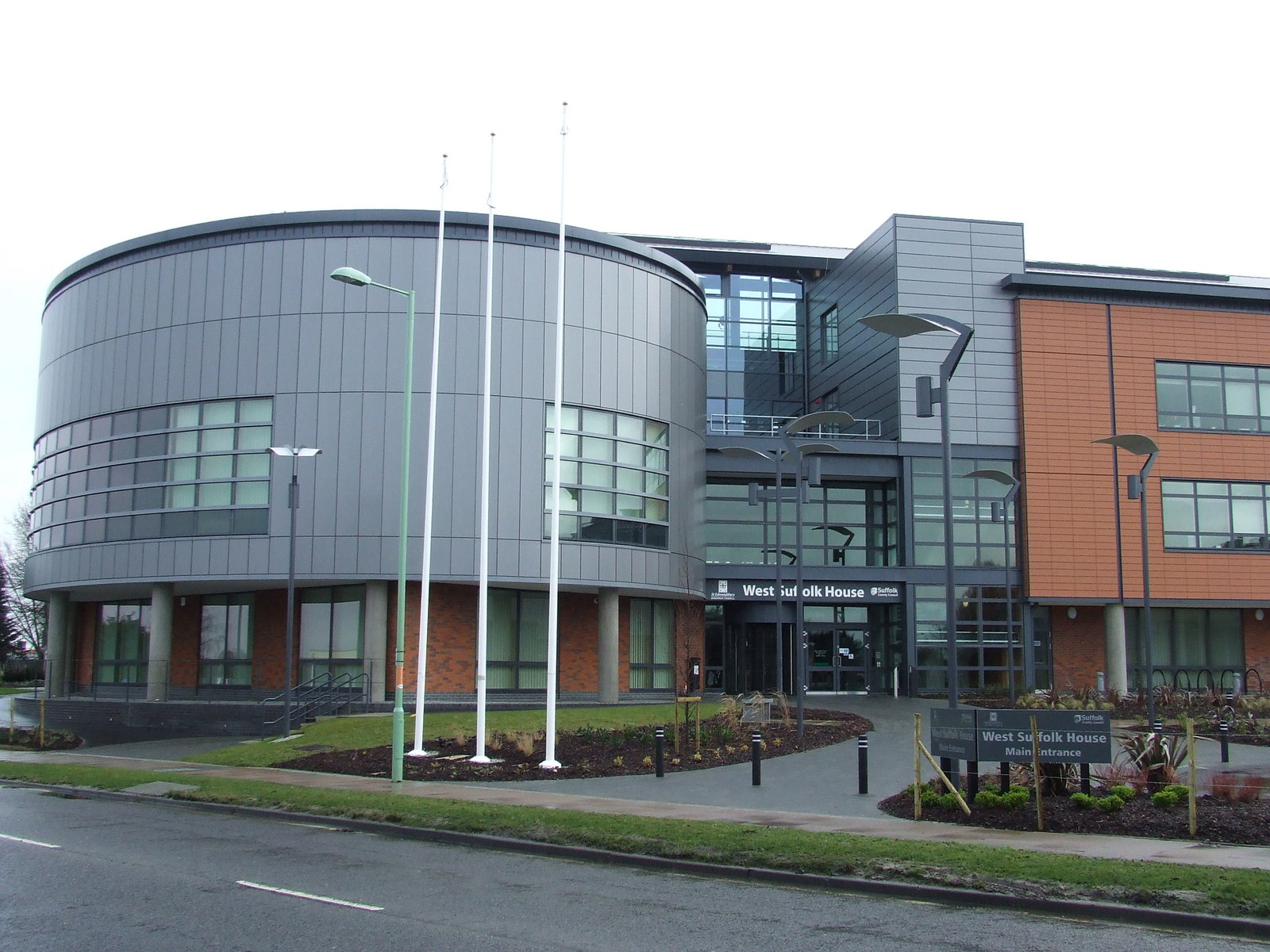
West Suffolk House

West Suffolk Council is also based in the town, at West Suffolk House on Western Way, which was built in 2009 and also includes an area office for the county council.

For national elections, the town forms part of the Bury St Edmunds and Stowmarket constituency. The current MP is Peter Prinsley of the Labour Party, who was first elected in the 2024 general election.

=== Administrative history ===
Bury St Edmunds was an ancient borough. It is known to have been granted a municipal charter by Henry I (reigned 1100–1135), which has since been lost. The borough was controlled by the abbey until its dissolution in 1539. James I issued a new charter in 1606, which confirmed Bury's ancient rights and incorporated it under a new constitution. The borough covered the two ancient parishes of St James and St Mary.

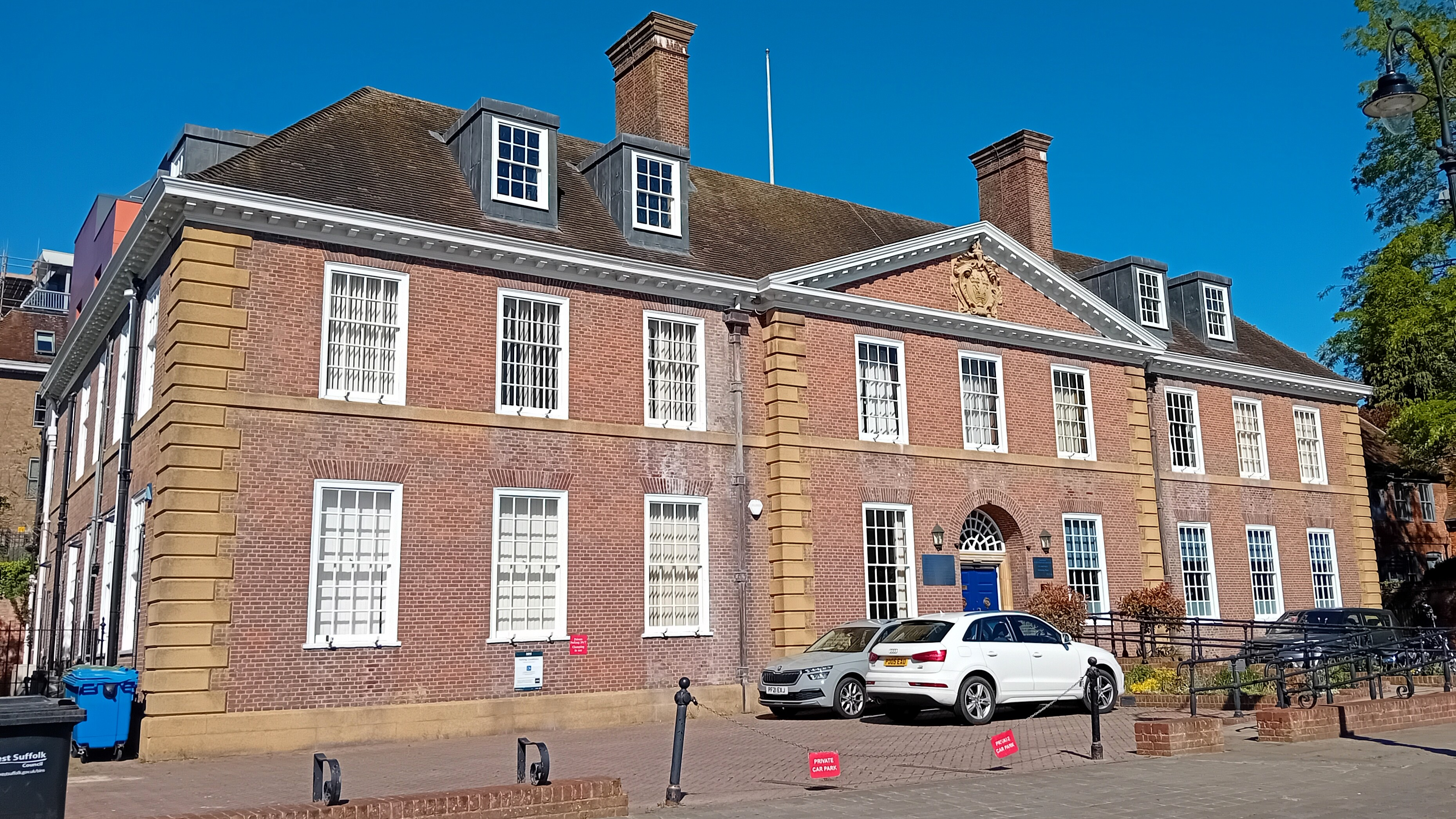
Register Office, 7 Angel Hill; built 1935 as Borough Offices

The borough was reformed to become a municipal borough in 1836 under the Municipal Corporations Act 1835, which standardised how most boroughs operated across the country. Until 30 September 1895 the borough contained the parishes of St James and St Mary when the 2 parishes were merged to form a single Bury St Edmunds parish. The borough was enlarged in 1935 to take in areas from the neighbouring parishes of Fornham All Saints and Westley. The borough council historically met at the Guildhall. It moved its offices to a new building called Borough Offices at 7 Angel Hill in 1935. Council meetings continued to be held at the Guildhall until 1966, when a new council chamber was built in an extension to the Borough Offices.

When elected county councils were established in 1889, the old western quarter sessions division of Suffolk was made the administrative county of West Suffolk. West Suffolk County Council was based in Bury, meeting at the town's courthouse, Shire Hall, which had been built around 1750.

The borough of Bury St Edmunds, the parish of Bury St Edmunds and administrative county of West Suffolk were abolished on 1 April 1974 under the Local Government Act 1972. Bury became part of the new Borough of St Edmundsbury, which covered the town and surrounding rural areas. The county-wide Suffolk County Council was created at the same time. St Edmundsbury Borough Council was based in the town, initially using various buildings inherited from its predecessors including the Borough Offices on Angel Hill. In 2009, it consolidated its offices at West Suffolk House, sharing the building with the county council.

No successor parish was created for the area of the abolished municipal borough at the time of the 1974 reforms, and so it became an unparished area. A new civil parish of Bury St Edmunds was created on 1 April 2003 which also took in the area of Hardwick parish that had been abolished in 1988 and had also become unparished. The parish council taking the name Bury St Edmunds Town Council. The town council election in 2007 was won by the "Abolish Bury Town Council" party, but they lost their majority shortly afterwards and the town council was not abolished. In 2020, the town council moved its meetings to the Guildhall.

In 2019, St Edmundsbury and the neighbouring district of Forest Heath merged into a new West Suffolk district (which covers a smaller area than the pre-1974 administrative county of the same name).

== Notable people ==
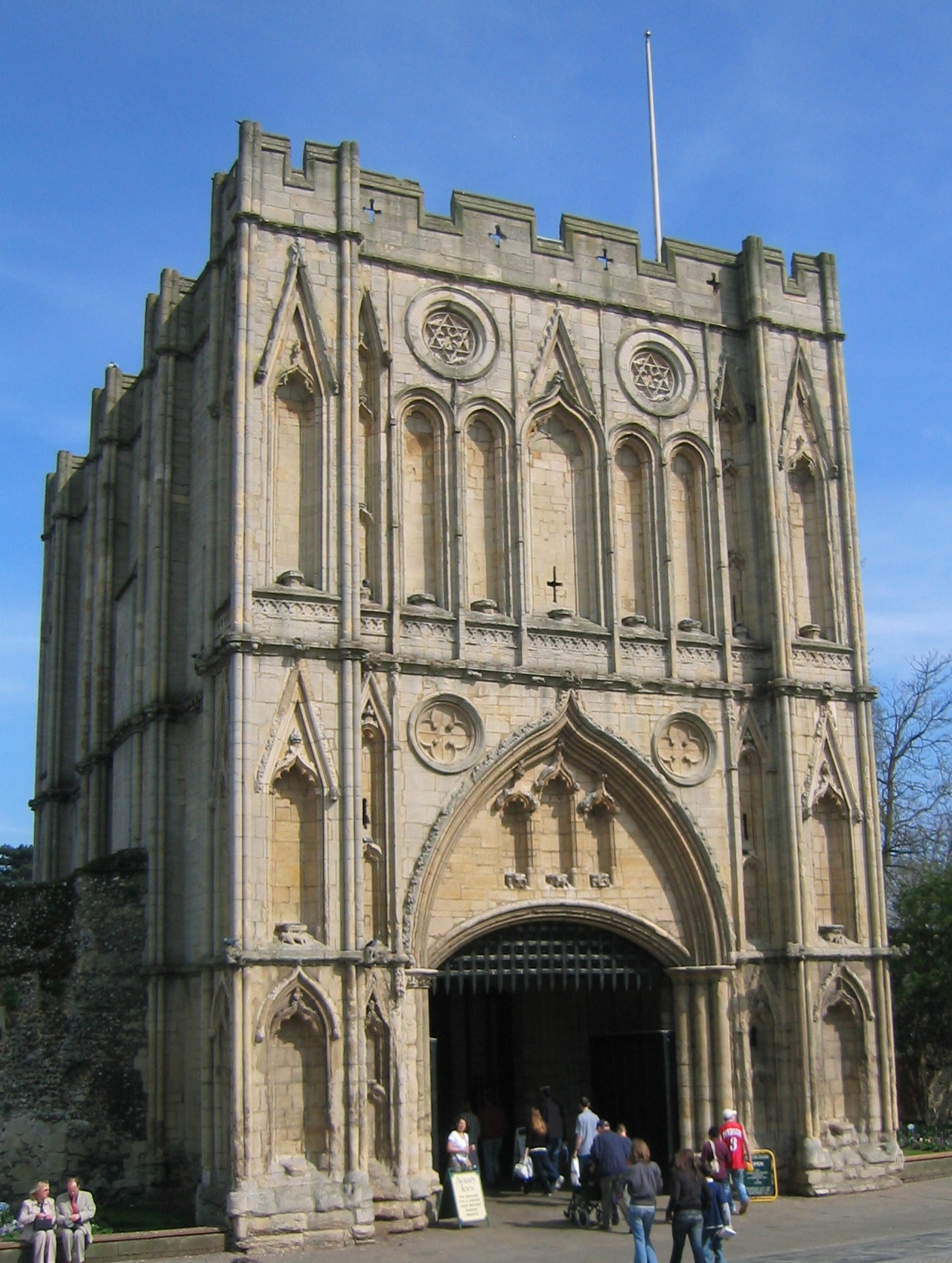
The Abbeygate, a local symbol of the town

Notable people from Bury St Edmunds include Bishop of Winchester and Lord High Chancellor of England Stephen Gardiner, the 18th-century landscape architect Humphry Repton, the Anglican priest and bibliophile Richard de Bury, the hymn writer Alice Flowerdew, the artist and photographer William Silas Spanton, the author Maria Louise Ramé (also known as Ouida), the engineer and inventor Hiram Codd, the cyclist James Moore, and the portrait painter Rose Mead. More recent figures from the town include artist and printer Sybil Andrews, artist and suffragette Helen Margaret Spanton, Canadian World War II general Guy Simonds, Winston Churchill's secretary Elizabeth Nel, theatre director Sir Peter Hall, Norwich City footballer Liam Gibbs, Canadian journalist and author Richard Gwyn, actors Bob Hoskins and Michael Maloney, speedway rider Danny Ayres, television presenter Becky Jago, digital writer and artist Chris Joseph, author, archaeologist and television presenter John-Henry Phillips, professional football player Ed Upson, and writer/director Adrian Tanner.

Thomas Clarkson, a leading abolitionist, lived in the town for parts of his life. Though born in Bedford, actor John Le Mesurier grew up in the town. Sir James Reynolds, junior, Lord Chief Baron of the Exchequer, lived in the town for much of his life and was buried in the Cathedral in 1739. Messenger Monsey, later physician to the Royal Hospital Chelsea and a man notorious in London society for his bad manners, practised in Bury in the 1720s. Children's writer A.M. Howell moved to Bury St Edmunds in 2001.

Among notable people who have chosen to retire to or have second homes in Bury St Edmunds are former members of parliament and government ministers Lord Tebbit, Sir John Wheeler, Sir Eldon Griffiths, and former senior Royal Air Force commander, Air Marshal Sir Reginald Harland.

=== Bands and Musicians ===
Notable bands and performers from Bury St Edmunds include Jacob's Mouse, Miss Black America, The Dawn Parade, Kate Jackson of The Long Blondes, Paul Hopfensperger of The Teazers and siblings Sean and Andi Oliver of Rip Rig + Panic. Sean Oliver also performed with Terence Trent D'Arby now known as Sananda Maitreya, Sean is credited by Sananda Maitreya for being the inspiration behind the international number 1 bestseller of Sananda Maitreya "Wishing Well".

== Education ==
=== Primary and secondary ===
State-funded primary schools that serve the town are Howard, Westgate, Hardwick, Sebert Wood, Abbot's Green, Sexton's Manor, Guildhall Feoffment, St Edmund's, St Edmundsbury and Tollgate Primary Schools.

The town has four secondary schools: Bury St Edmunds County High School, King Edward VI School, St Benedict's Catholic School and Sybil Andrews Academy.

In 2019 the town's first Sixth Form College, Abbeygate Sixth Form College, opened. It is located on Beeton's Way. Upon its opening, King Edward VI School closed its Sixth Form provision.

The closest public school (for a period post-war, a Direct grant grammar school) to the town is Culford School, located just north of the town in the village of Culford. The town has one independent preparatory school, South Lee School. The former Moreton Hall Preparatory School closed in 2020.

=== Higher and further ===
The town's largest further education provider is West Suffolk College, with over 10,000 students studying with the college every year. The college was set to expand in September 2018, following a £7m government grant to help pay for an £8m energy, engineering and manufacturing teaching centre. From 2015, students have been able to study foundation and undergraduate degrees at the University of Suffolk at West Suffolk College.

== Transport ==
Bury St Edmunds railway station serves the town, operated by Greater Anglia, on the Ipswich to Ely Line. Trains run seven days a week, every two hours to Peterborough and hourly to Ipswich and Cambridge. Trains from Peterborough continue to Ipswich after Bury St Edmunds. Onward train connections from Cambridge link with London King's Cross, London Liverpool Street and Stansted Airport, whilst Ipswich provides connections to Liverpool Street via Colchester.

The main interchange for bus and coach services for Bury St Edmunds is the bus and coach station, located on St Andrews Street North in the town centre. Bus services link the town centre with the main residential housing areas of the town. From November 2012 Sunday bus services were introduced over some of these routes. There are regular bus services to the neighbouring towns of Brandon, Cambridge, Diss, Haverhill, Ipswich, Mildenhall, Newmarket, Stowmarket, Sudbury and Thetford and many of the villages in between. Daily National Express coach services between Victoria Coach Station in London and Bury stop at the town's bus and coach station, as does the cross-country service between Clacton-on-Sea and Liverpool which travels via Cambridge, Peterborough, Leicester, Nottingham, Sheffield and Manchester.

The town is partly bisected by the A14 trunk road, running east–west and serving as a major transport corridor between the east coast and the Midlands. There are three junctions serving Bury St Edmunds, numbered 42-44 and denoted west, central and east respectively.

== Twin towns ==
Bury St Edmunds is twinned with:

- Compiègne, Oise, Picardy, France
- Huy, Wallonia, Liège, Belgium
- Kevelaer, North Rhine-Westphalia, Germany
- Xi'an, Shaanxi, China

== Affiliations ==
- HMS Vengeance: Royal Navy Vanguard Class SSBN

== Literature ==
Bury St Edmunds is a location mentioned several times in the short ghost story The Ash-tree by M.R. James published in Ghost Stories of an Antiquary in 1904.

Author Norah Lofts, though born in Shipdham, Norfolk, bases many of her stories in Baildon, a fictionalised Bury St Edmunds, where she was educated and lived.

== Arms ==
Coat of arms of Bury St Edmunds

Notes
Granted 29 November 1606
Crest
On a wreath of the colours a wolf sejant Proper holding a king's head couped at the neck of the last crowned Or.
Escutcheon
Azure three open crowns Or each transfixed with two arrows in saltire [points downward] Argent.
Motto
Sacrarium Regis Cunabula Legis (The Shrine Of The King And The Cradle Of The Law)

== See also ==
- Bury St Edmunds Cross
