= Fingerpost =

Sign post pointing in the direction of travel

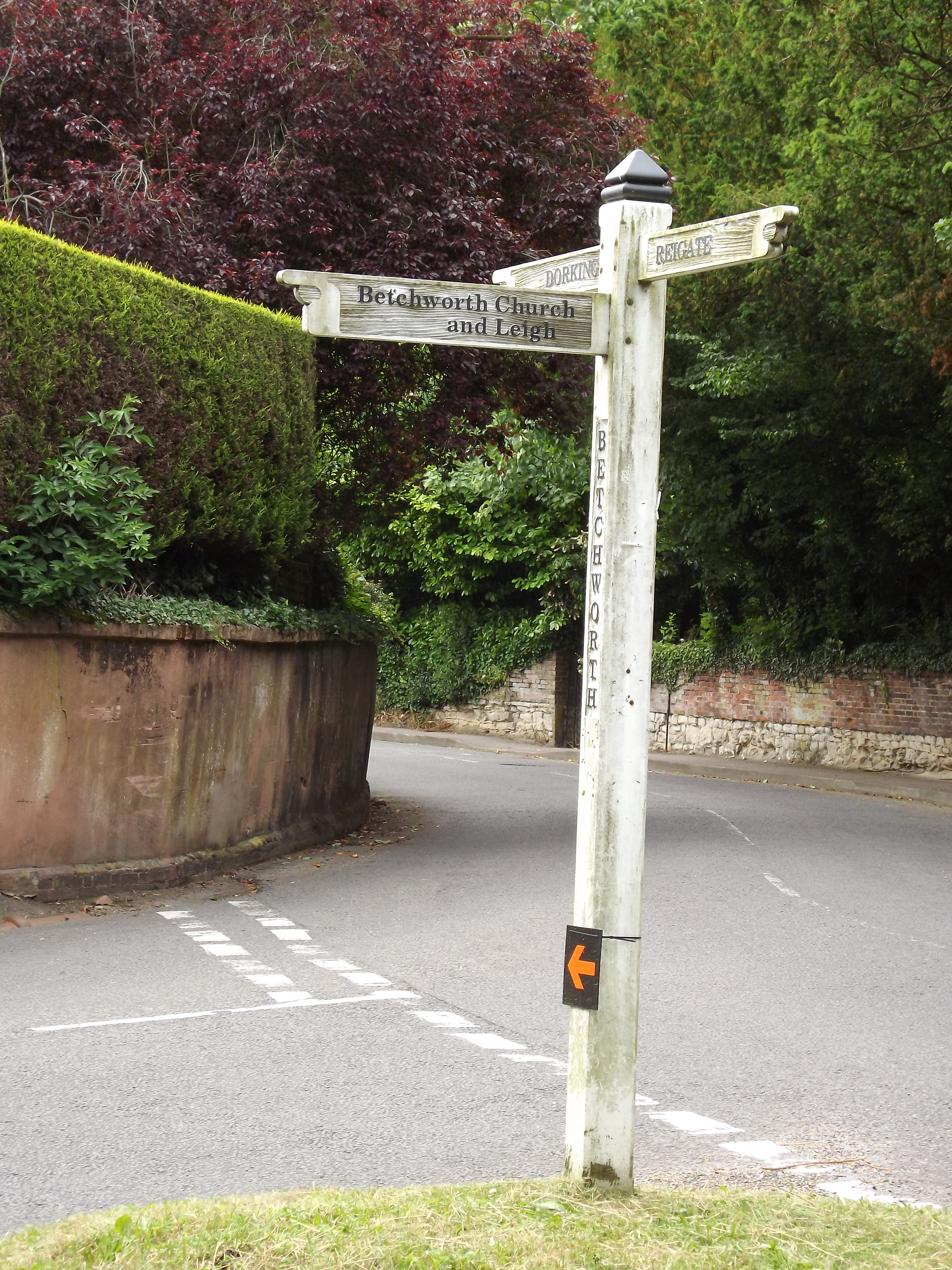
A fingerpost at Betchworth, Surrey. The additional orange arrow shows the route of a cyclosportive.

A fingerpost (or guidepost) is a type of sign post consisting of a post with one or more arms, known as fingers, pointing in the direction of travel to places named on the fingers, often including distance information.

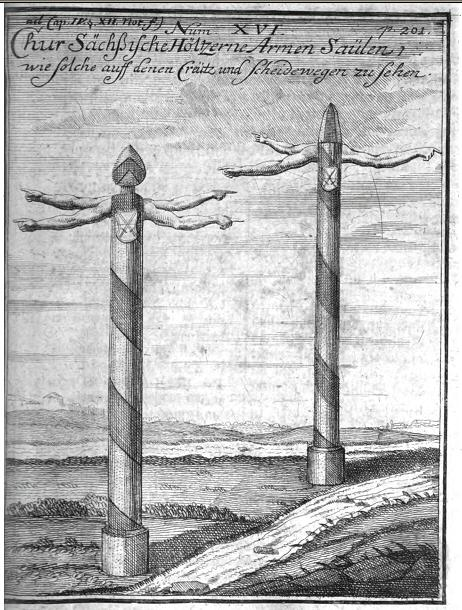
Early wooden fingerposts in Saxony

== United Kingdom ==
Fingerposts are a traditional type of sign used in the United Kingdom. The posts have traditionally been made from cast iron or wood, with poles painted in black, white or grey and fingers with black letters on a white background, often including distance information in miles.

In most cases, they are used to give guidance for road users, but examples also exist on the canal network, for instance. They are also used to mark the beginning of a footpath, bridleway, or similar public path.

=== History ===
In 1697 the Highways Act entered force in England, enabling magistrates to order the erection of "a stone or post with an inscription" at the "Place where Two or more Crosse High-ways meet". However, the oldest fingerpost still extant is thought to be that close to Chipping Campden in Gloucestershire, dated 1669 and pointing to Oxford, Warwick, Gloucester and Worcester (abbreviated to 'Gloster' and 'Woster'). The Highways Act 1766 and Turnpike Roads Act 1773 made use of fingerposts on turnpike roads compulsory.

The Motor Car Act 1903 passed road sign responsibilities to the relevant highway authority within the then United Kingdom of Great Britain and Ireland, although no specifications were set. Guidance was given in a 1921 circular that road direction signs should have 2 1/2-or-3-inch-high (64 or 76 mm) upper case lettering on a white background and white supporting poles. It also recommended that the name of the highway authority be included somewhere in the design.

Mandatory standards (The Traffic Signs (Size, Colour and Type) Provisional Regulations) were passed for Great Britain in 1933 which required poles to painted with black and white bands and lettering to be of a different typeface. Signposts were removed across much of the United Kingdom of Great Britain and Northern Ireland during World War II, lest enemy forces use them for navigation, and replaced in the late 1940s.

Road signing was next comprehensively reviewed in the United Kingdom from 1961 by the government-appointed Worboys Committee and the 1964 Traffic Signs Regulations brought in the signing system largely remaining in force today. Whilst the 1964 regulations did encourage local authorities to remove and replace traditional fingerposts with the new designs, it was not made compulsory to do so. Regulations did not, however, permit new fingerpost style signs to be erected until a design was permitted by the Department for the Environment in 1994 (in the Traffic Signs Regulations and General Directions of that year). Of note was that the design did not allow for mileages of over three miles to be expressed with the use of halves and quarters. It is thus that new fingerposts have been required to round the previously more precise distance measurements.

Whilst the 1964 regulations did not bring about a general requirement to remove all fingerposts in Great Britain (signage in Northern Ireland being treated somewhat separately), some counties appear to have been more zealous than others in eradicating them. Fingerpost survival is highest in rural areas and away from major roads. Reacting to concern about the loss of historic fingerposts from the rural landscape, an advisory leaflet was issued by the Department for Transport and English Heritage in June 2005 which stated that "All surviving traditional fingerpost direction signs should be retained in-situ and maintained on a regular basis. They should be repainted every five years in traditional black and white livery. Other colours should be used only when these are known to have been in use before 1940". In recent years several county councils have embarked on restoration and repair programmes for their fingerpost stock, including the Highway Heritage Project in the Quantock Hills of Somerset.

=== Local variation in historic designs ===
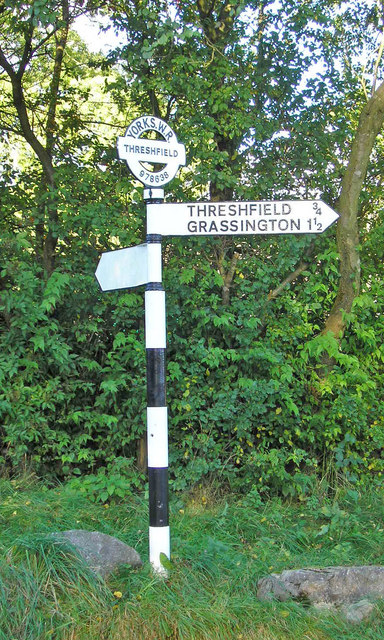
A typical Royal Label Factory West Riding "Geared" fingerpost with the parish name and grid reference on the roundel.

Whilst some elements of fingerpost design were prescribed during the period when their introduction became most widespread, there was plenty of scope for distinctive spread of designs which remains to today.

The inclusion of the highway authority name took the form of raised or recessed lettering written down the poles or as part of a finial or roundel (when the centre is hollow, called an annulus) design, either in full or as initials (e.g. K.C.C. for Kesteven County Council). Roundel designs can also include junction names (for example, Molly Brown's Corner, in Lytchett Matravers, Dorset) or village names. County Council coats of arms feature in counties such as West Sussex. The Ministry for Transport asked the County Councils in Dorset and the West Riding of Yorkshire to experiment with the inclusion of a grid reference and these remain common in these areas. The roundel on a 2005 replacement at West Wellow (Hampshire) directing travellers to St Margaret's Church bears a portrait of Florence Nightingale who is interred at the churchyard.

Fingers can be square-ended (such as in Cornwall and Norfolk), curved (as in Dorset) or triangular-ended (as is common in Somerset). Where timber was used for the fingers, place names are composed of individually affixed metal letters. Mileage is typically measured to the nearest quarter mile, with fractions being mounted on a separate ready-made plate, although measurements to the fifth or eighth of a mile are given in East Lothian. Due to their age, some fingerposts have 'fossilised' the historic spelling of places which was dominant at the time of their construction. Examples include "Portisham", rather than the modern spelling "Portesham" and the pre-decimal "6D Handley" for Sixpenny Handley in Dorset.

Some fingerpost arm examples include the A- or B-road number as well as the destination, although many more of these examples were removed and replaced after the 1964 regulations were introduced. It appears that the original convention was for A-road numbers to be in white on a black background and the converse arrangement for B-road numbers, although there are few fingerposts with this as their current scheme.

Although most fingerposts are a combination of black, white or grey, other colour variants exist. The most well-known are the small number of Red Posts which are found in some of the southern English counties, including four in Dorset, including one on the A31 trunk road at Anderson, between Bere Regis and Wimborne Minster. The others are located at Benville Bridge, Hewood Corner and near Poyntington. Various theories have been put forward as to their colour, including being to mark routes used by prisoners on their way to port for transportation to Australia, or the site of a gibbet. Other places have fingerpost arms with white writing on a green background which indicates the most minor of lanes, sometimes known as 'drift roads'.

=== Post-Worboys fingerpost designs ===
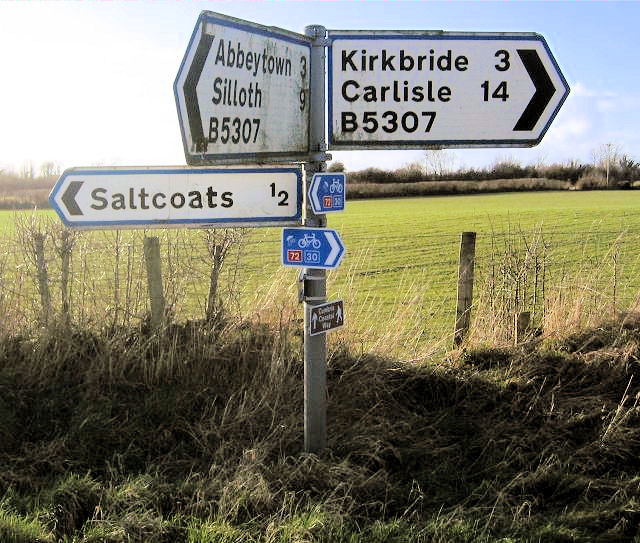
A post-Worboys fingerpost with smaller signs for the National Cycle Network (in blue) and the Cumbria Coastal Way footpath (in brown).

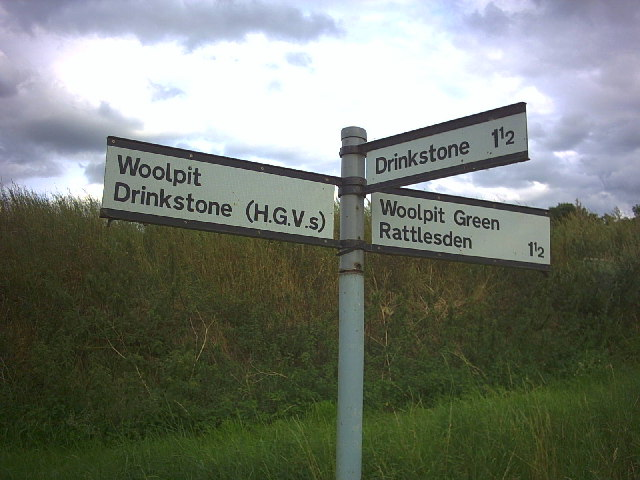
An example of the Suffolk County Council "square end" design near Woolpit.

Some highway authorities chose to apply the spirit of the Worboys regulations in a fingerpost style, including the use of the Transport Heavy typeface. Arm materials have tended either to be aluminium or plastic. Devon County Council introduced triangular-ended fingerposts with edges in four different colours to illustrate the suitability of the route for various types of vehicles, from black (for most vehicles, on A- and B-roads), through blue and brown to fully white fingers, indicating local access only. This system was entitled the Functional Road Network. Suffolk County Council, too, adopted the use of Transport Heavy typefaces on square-ended fingers, and here distances over three miles are still given to the nearest quarter.

=== Literary references ===
The term "fingerpost" recently received some attention from its use in the best-selling novel, An Instance of the Fingerpost by Iain Pears. The source of the title is found in an epigraph to Part IV of the novel: a—much abbreviated—translation of Aphorism XXI from Book Two, Section XXXVI of Francis Bacon's Novum Organum Scientiarum.

== Republic of Ireland ==
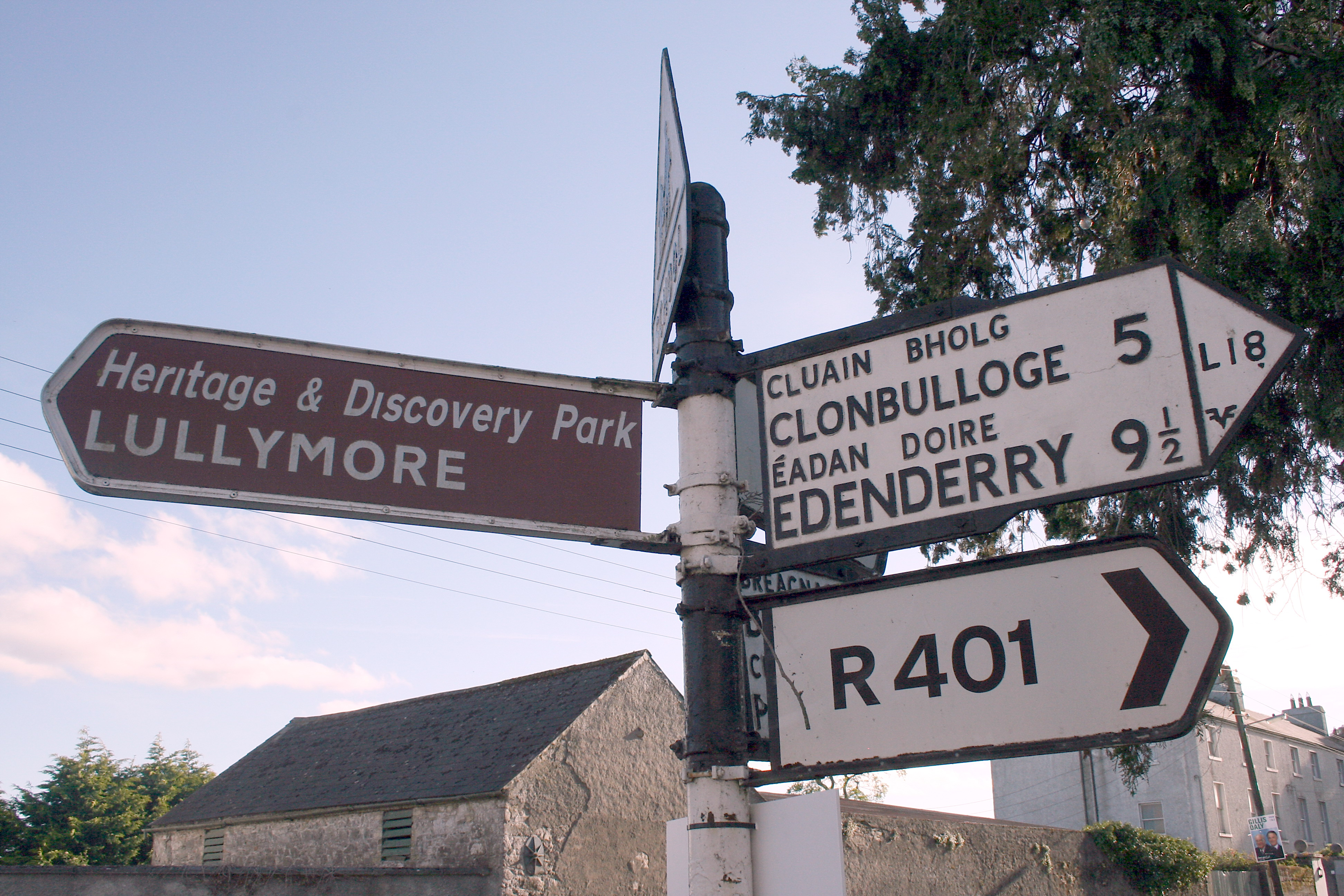
Fingerpost in Rathangan, County Kildare

Before 1977, fingerposts similar to those found in the United Kingdom were the main form of signage used on roads in the Republic of Ireland. They were of similar design to their UK counterparts and included the logo of Bord Fáilte (which took over responsibility for erecting signage in Ireland from the Automobile Association), or a harp after signage was handed over to local councils. These fingerposts were bilingual, with the Irish name printed, in a smaller typeface, above the standard placename. A number of these signs continue to exist on Irish regional and local roads. However, as distances on them are in miles and not kilometres (as used on modern Irish signage), they have gradually been replaced.

Since the adoption of signs based on the UK 1965 Worboys Committee design in 1977, local authorities within Ireland have erected fingerpost signage on many roads despite the fact that the Irish Traffic Signs Manual discourages fingerposts for all but minor routes.

In the Irish language, a fingerpost is called méar eolais (lit. 'finger of information').

== Continental Europe ==
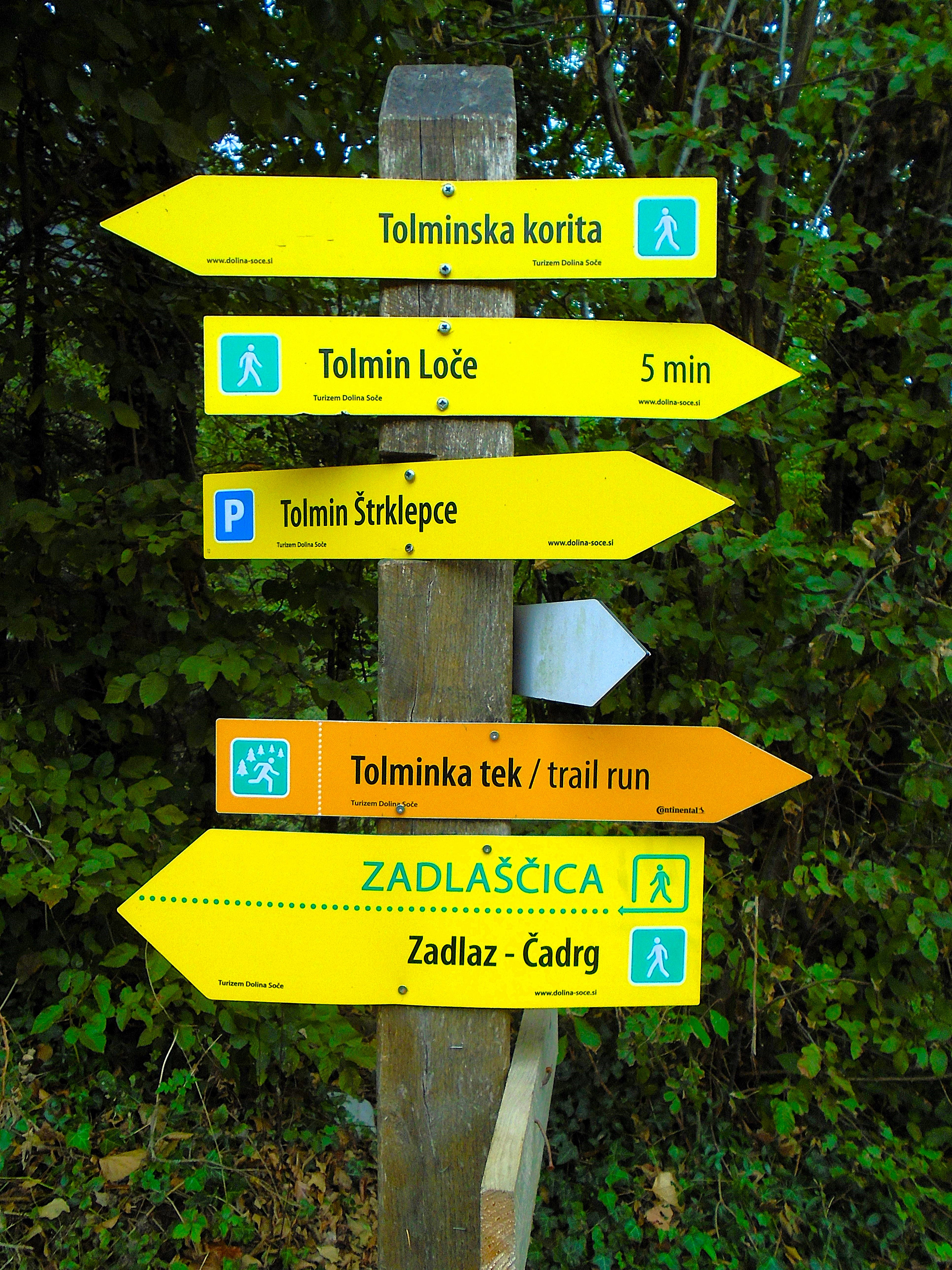
Fingerpost in the Republic of Slovenia.

Fingerposts were also used in Continental Europe; in the Electorate of Saxony they were a precursor to the Saxon post milestones.

== United States ==
More recently, the Jet Propulsion Laboratory in Pasadena, California has installed LED fingerposts which orient themselves to planets, missions, and exoplanets using data supplied by the Deep Space Network.

An animated, living fingerpost voiced by Jack E. Leonard appears in Hal Sutherland's Journey Back to Oz.

The Adirondack Mountains of New York are known for fingerposts. They customarily have yellow lettering on a brown background and sometimes have an arrow painted on them rather than having the pointing end of the sign have a physical arrow or pointed finger.

== Gallery ==
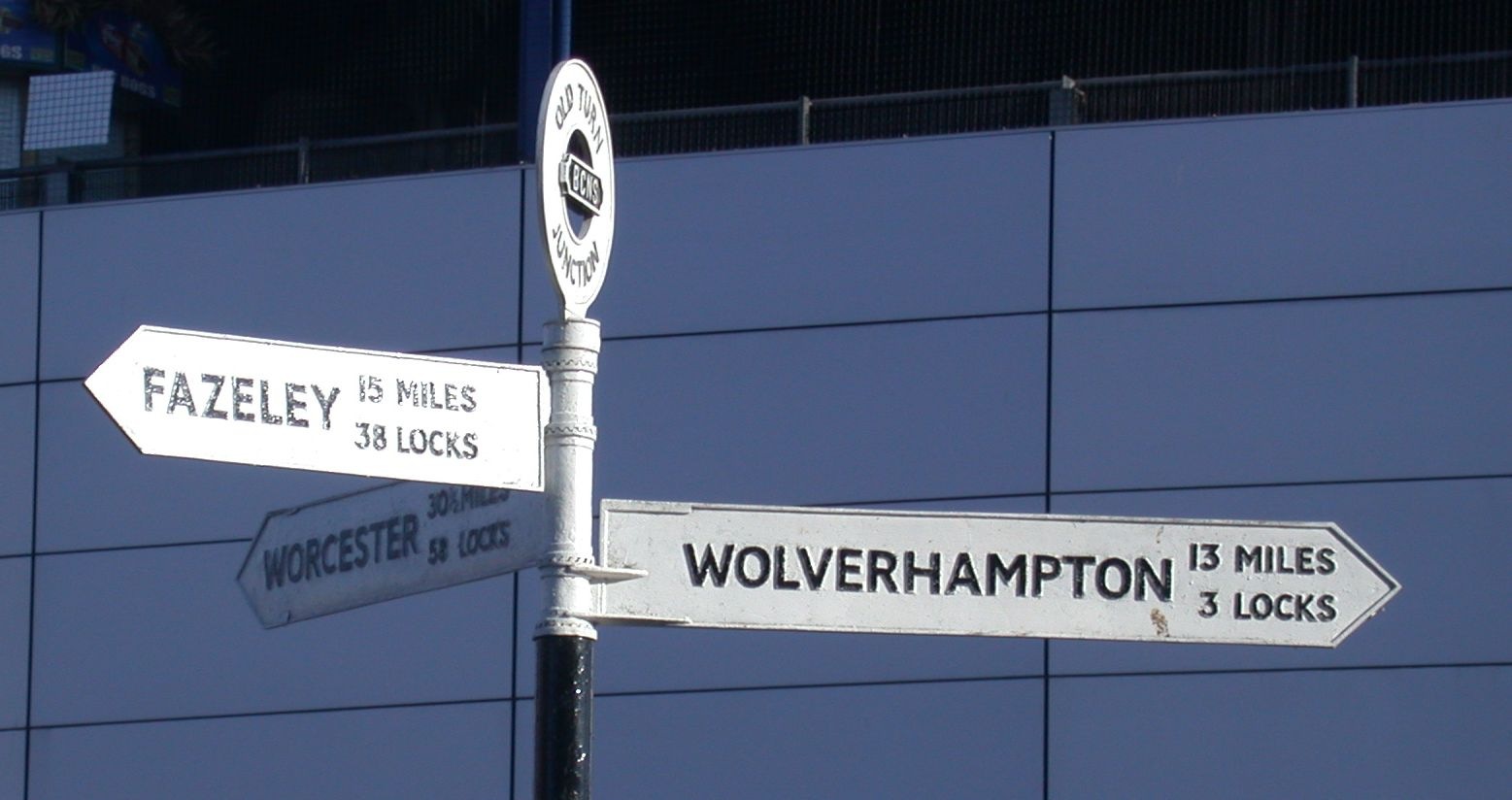
A Royal Label Factory "Geared" canal fingerpost at Old Turn Junction Birmingham, where the Birmingham Canal Navigations Main Line and Birmingham and Fazeley Canal meet. Beneath the distance, the number of locks is given

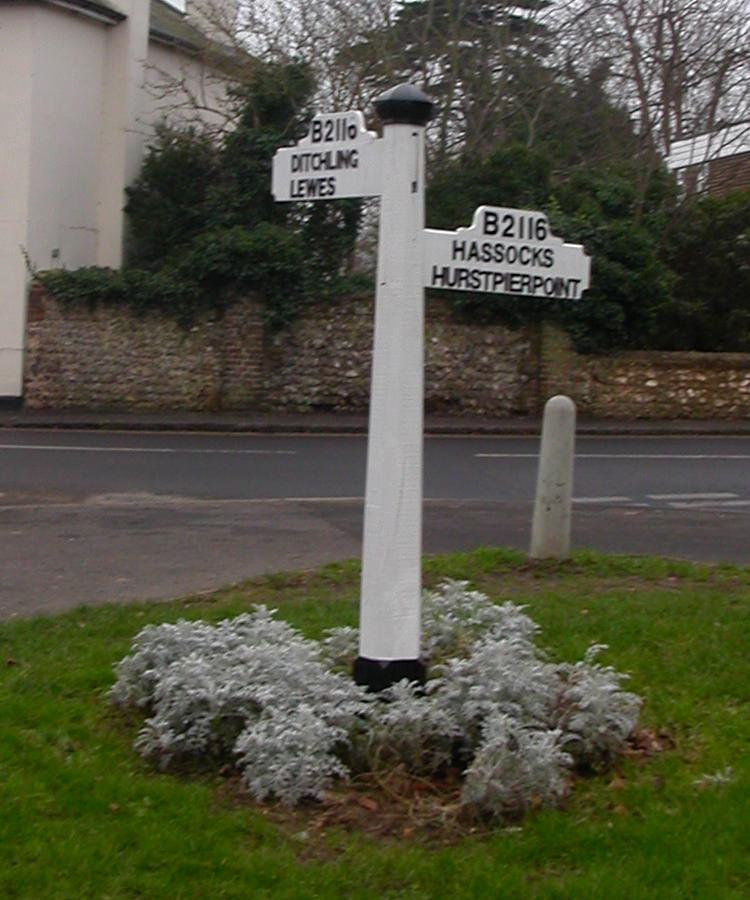
A finger post at Keymer in West Sussex (formerly East Sussex), showing the B-road number and significant destinations on it

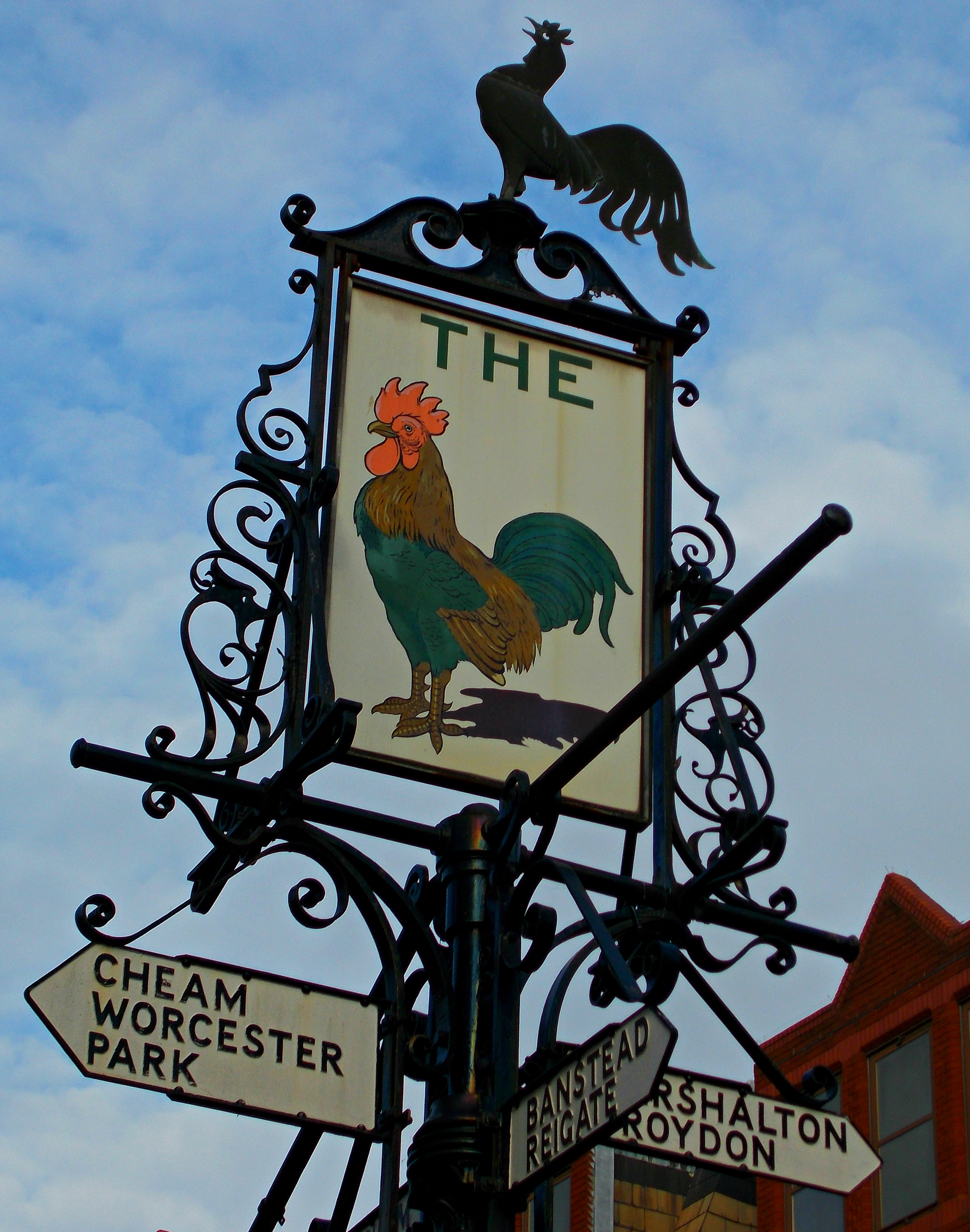
A finger post in Sutton town centre, London, incorporating the sign of the former Cock inn

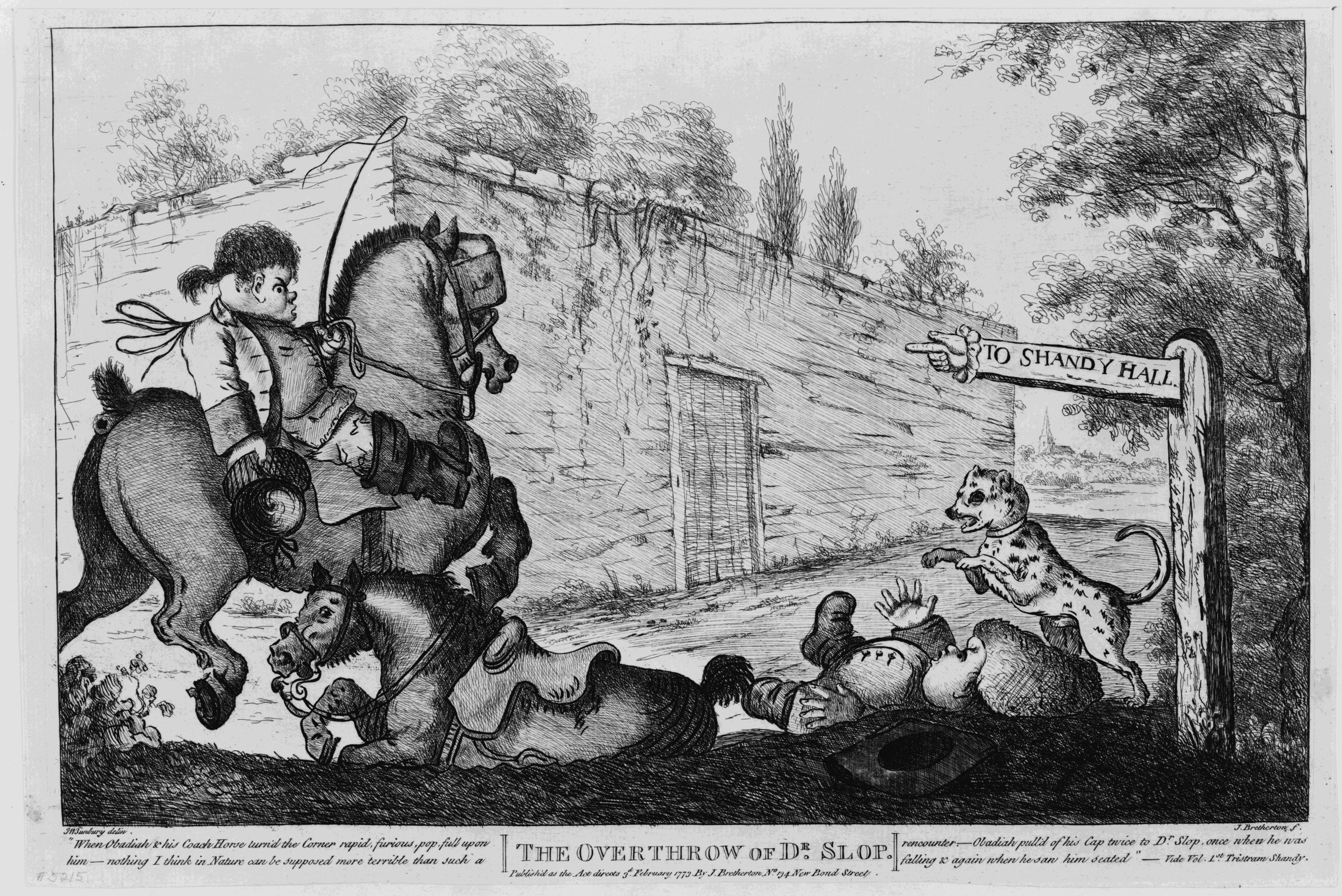
A British cartoon from 1773 showing an elaborate pointing hand fingerpost

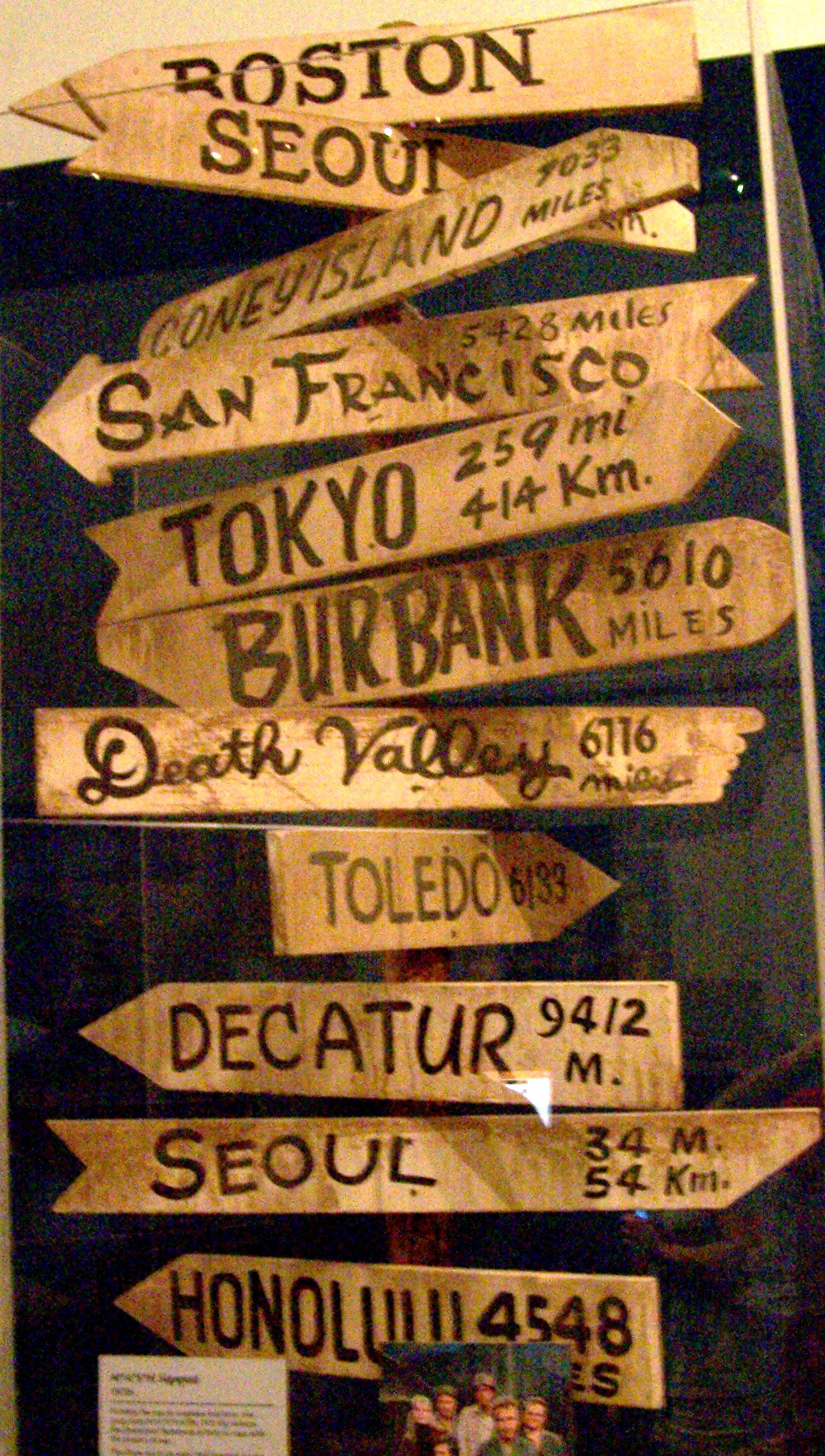
The fingerpost featured on the television series M*A*S*H, now in the Smithsonian

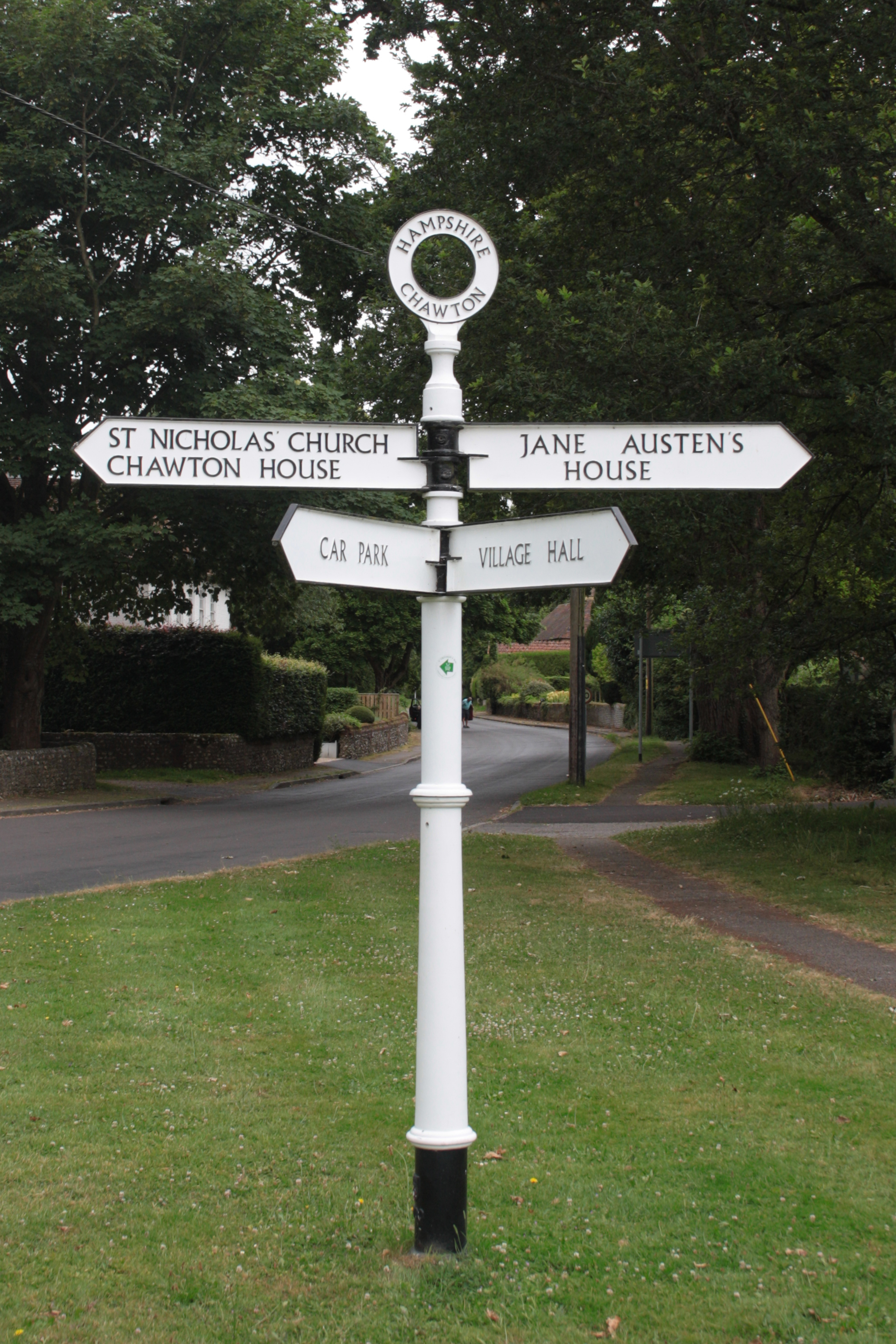
A finger post in Chawton, Hampshire, outside of the Jane Austen House Museum.

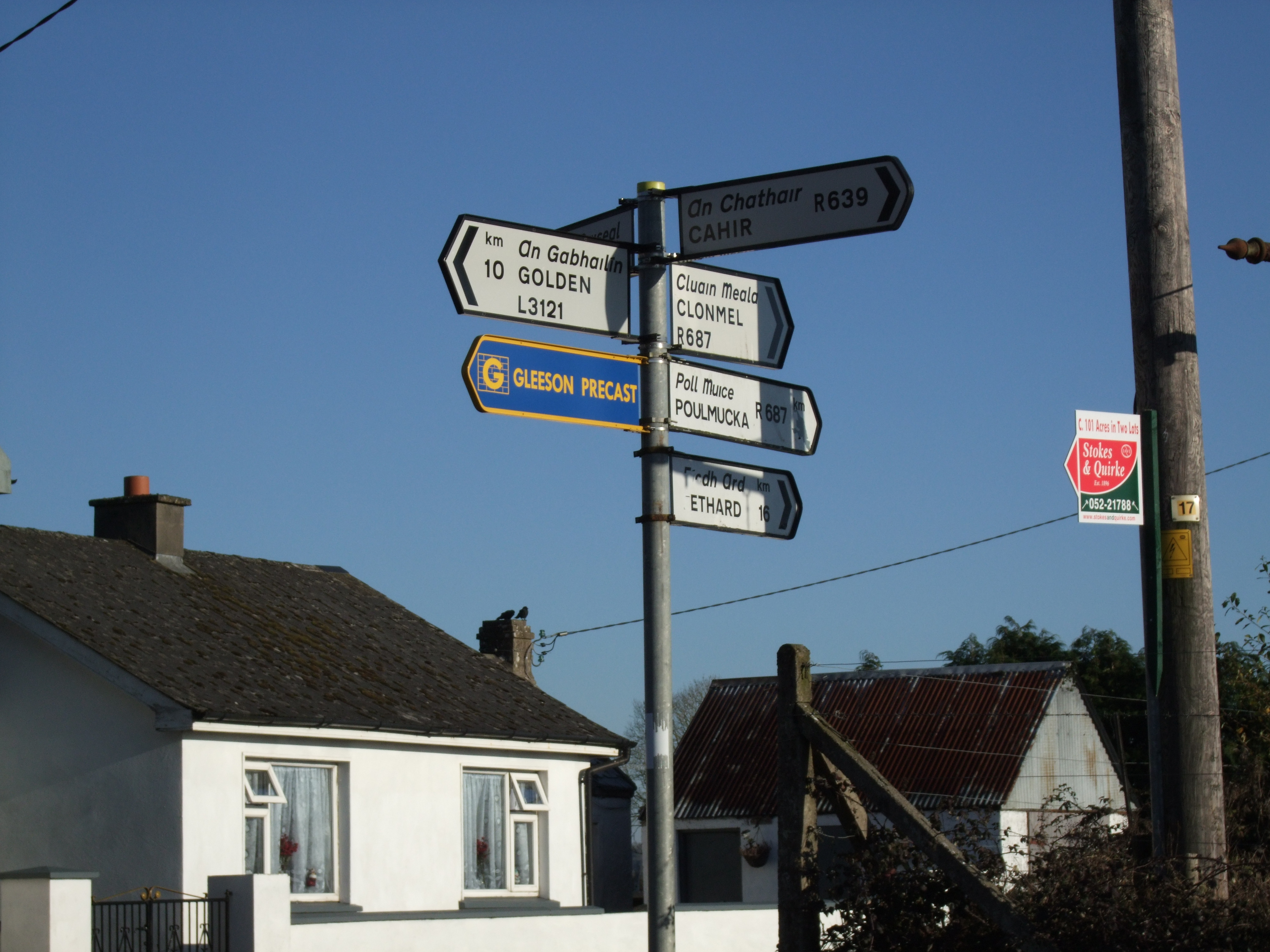
Fingerpost in New Inn, County Tipperary

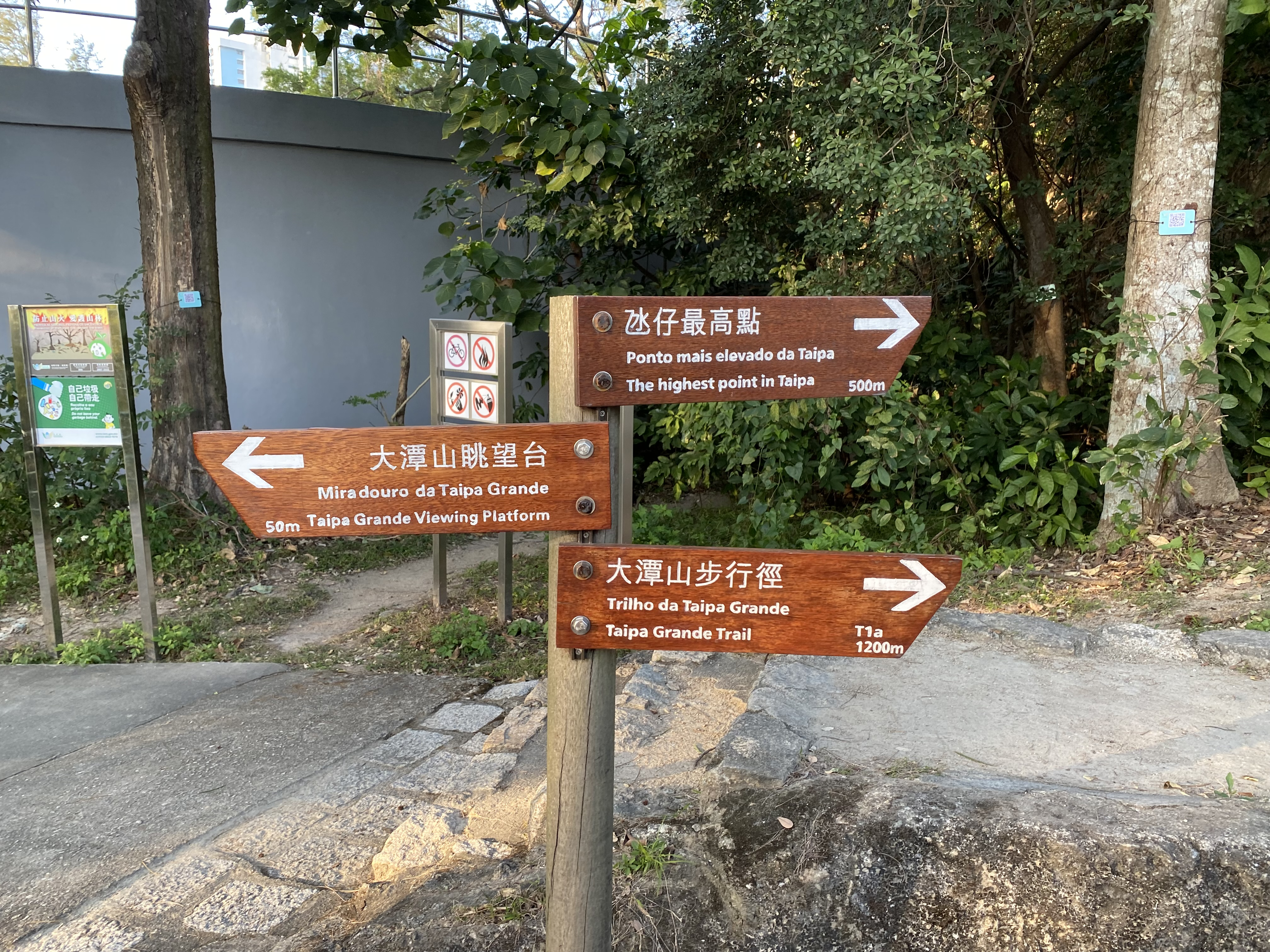
Trilingual Chinese–Portuguese–English fingerpost along the Taipa Grande Trail in Macau

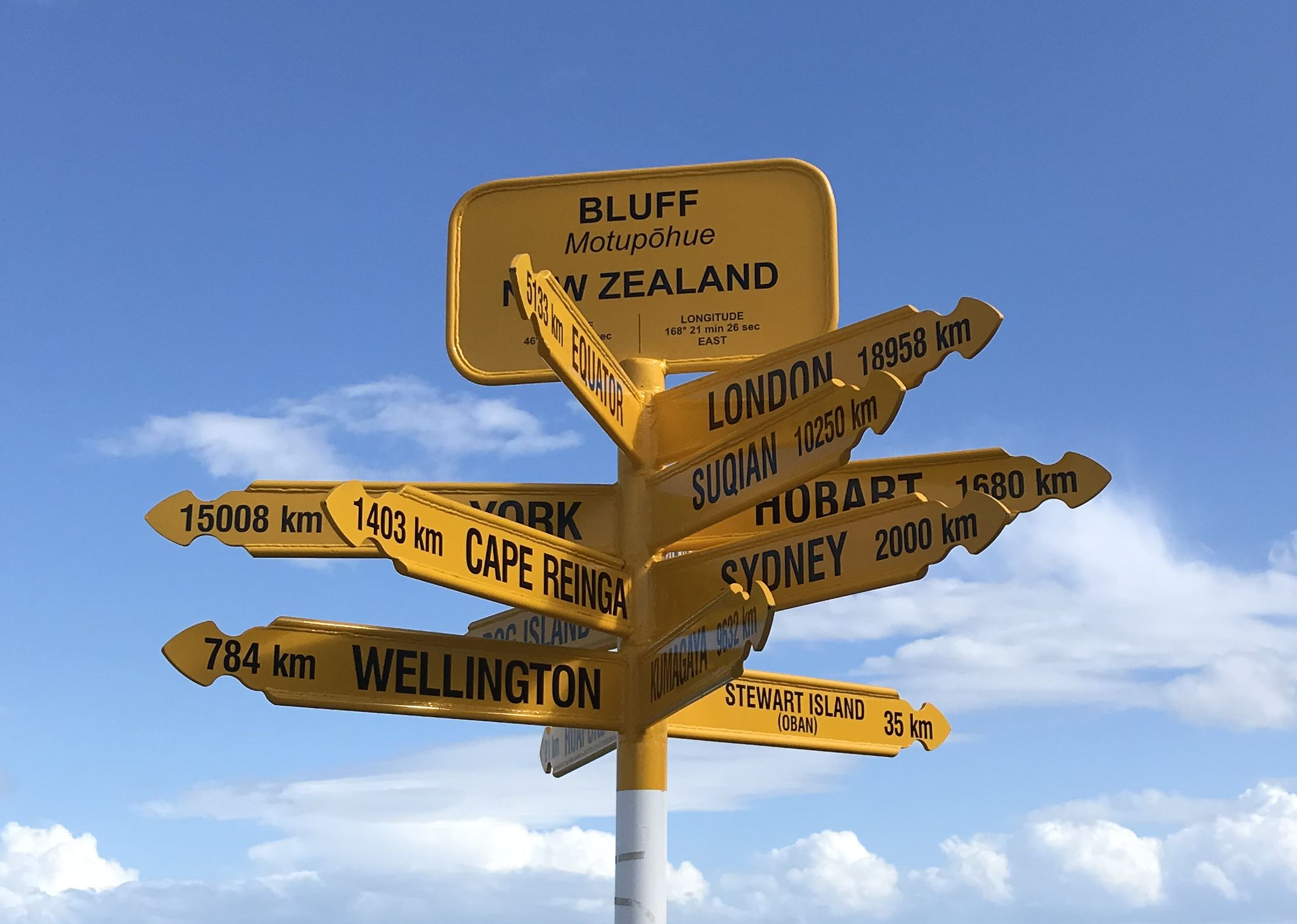
Fingerpost in Bluff, New Zealand

== See also ==
- Index (typography)
- Pillar of Salt, a unique fingerpost
- Road signs in Northern Ireland
- Road signs in the Republic of Ireland
- Road signs in the United Kingdom
- Here (sculpture)
