= St Benedict's Catholic School =

Location
- Beetons Way; Bury St Edmunds, Suffolk, IP32 6RH; England; 52°15′30″N 0°42′07″E

Information
- Type: Academy
- Motto: Ora et Labora
- Religious affiliation: Roman Catholic
- Established: 1967
- Local authority: Suffolk County Council
- Trust: Our Lady of Walsingham Catholic Trust
- Department for Education URN: 149285 Tables
- Ofsted: Reports
- Head teacher: Mrs Imogen Senior
- Head of Sixth Form: Mr J Richmond
- Staff: 118
- Gender: Coeducational
- Age: 11 to 18
- Enrolment: c.980
- Houses: Monte Casino, Nursia, Subiaco
- Colours: Green, Silver and Black
- Website: http://www.st-benedicts.suffolk.sch.uk

St Benedict's Catholic School is a coeducational Roman Catholic secondary school and sixth form in Bury St Edmunds, Suffolk, England. Opened in 1967, the school has around 980 students.

Previously a voluntary aided school administered by Suffolk County Council, in September 2022 St Benedict's Catholic School converted to academy status. The school is now part of the Our Lady of Walsingham Catholic Trust, and continues to be under the jurisdiction of the Roman Catholic Diocese of East Anglia.

St Benedict's was a Mathematics and Computing Specialist School. Whilst the school is based in Bury St. Edmunds, many of its students travel from a wide area, including Haverhill, Thetford, Sudbury, Stowmarket, Newmarket and other surrounding villages and towns, because it is the only Catholic secondary school in the vicinity.

== Academic Achievement ==
=== GCSE ===
As of 2023, St Benedict's had a 79% standard pass rate (grades 4+ in English and maths) and a 55% strong pass rate (grades 5+ in English and maths). Many students go on to study A-Levels, and the school sees some of the top students in the country, having had students achieve 12 grade 9s for multiple years in a row, something that is on average accomplished by 120 students in the UK each year.

=== A-Level ===
In 2019, St Benedict's achieved a 100% pass rate (A-E), with 86% of students getting grades which were between A* - C and 20% of students achieved 3 or more grades between A-A*. The sixth form has been rated the best state sixth form in Suffolk for multiple years in a row as of 2023.

== Staff ==
Since 2019, Imogen Senior has been Headteacher at St Benedict's. From 2017 to 2019, Kate Pereira was Headteacher after taking over from Hugh O'Neill who retired after working at the school for 33 years. As of 2024, there were roughly 118 members of staff working at the school with 65 members of teaching staff.

== Ofsted ==
The school was graded as Outstanding or Good in all areas in the Ofsted inspection carried out in September 2016. In 2022, it was judged Good. As of 2026, the most recent inspection was in 2025; no grade was given but Ofsted found that the school "has taken effective action to maintain the standards identified at the previous inspection". and described the school as having a 'bold and ambitious curriculum' and 'deeply supportive and nurturing.

Historic Ofsted inspection of predecessor school

In September 2014, a snap Ofsted inspection (which were introduced after Operation Trojan Horse), was held at the school. Following the inspection, the school's previous rating of good was downgraded to "needs improvement". Inspectors found St Benedict's to be in breach of rules surrounding guarding against extremism and radicalisation, and were failing to prepare students "for life and work in modern Britain". The report was withdrawn within hours, with Ofsted stating that "quality assurance checks" were required. In November 2014, the school was one of 11 highlighted by Ofsted as failing to promote British values.

The wording of the report was later revised, with references to extremism and radicalisation removed, but the needs improvement rating was maintained. The decision to downgrade the school was criticised both by the Head teacher of the school and the Catholic Education Service. An interim inspection then took place in January 2015, and Ofsted wrote to the school to confirm "the school has made progress in key areas since the inspection." Later that month the school was ranked second in the West Suffolk league table, with headteacher Hugh O'Neill stating, "The results vindicate the work we do here. I think you will find that there is a disparity between schools' Ofsted ratings and their position in the league table across the county."

== Curriculum ==
The school follows the National Curriculum and offers a range of subjects at GCSE and A-Level. As a Catholic school, Religious Education is taught from that standpoint and remains a core subject at GCSE.

The school offers a sixth form for students over the age of 16, covering Year 12s and Year 13s.
