= A. M. Howell =

English children's writer

Ann-Marie Howell
- Occupation: Children's writer
- Website: amhowell.co.uk

Ann-Marie Howell is an English children's author who writes historical mystery novels.

== Biography ==
Howell lived in Nottinghamshire before studying at the University of Manchester, where she completed a BA in geography and an MA in Town Planning. She joined West Suffolk Council, writing local government policy documents. She moved to Bury St Edmunds in 2001 and took the Curtis Brown Creative Writing for Children Course in 2015.

== Writing ==
Howell initially wrote contemporary teen fiction, but it was not until she moved to historical fiction that her first novel, The Garden Of Lost Secrets, was published by Usborne in 2019. It was followed by The House of One Hundred Clocks (2020), The Mystery of the Night Watchers (2021), The Secret of the Treasure Keepers (2022) and Mysteries at Sea: Peril on the Atlantic (2023).

== Published works ==
Year	Title	Publisher
2019	The Garden Of Lost Secrets	Usborne
2020	The House of One Hundred Clocks	Usborne
2021	The Mystery of the Night Watchers	Usborne
2022	The Secret of the Treasure Keepers	Usborne
2023	Mysteries at Sea: Peril on the Atlantic	Usborne
