= Edmund Gillingwater =

English antiquarian

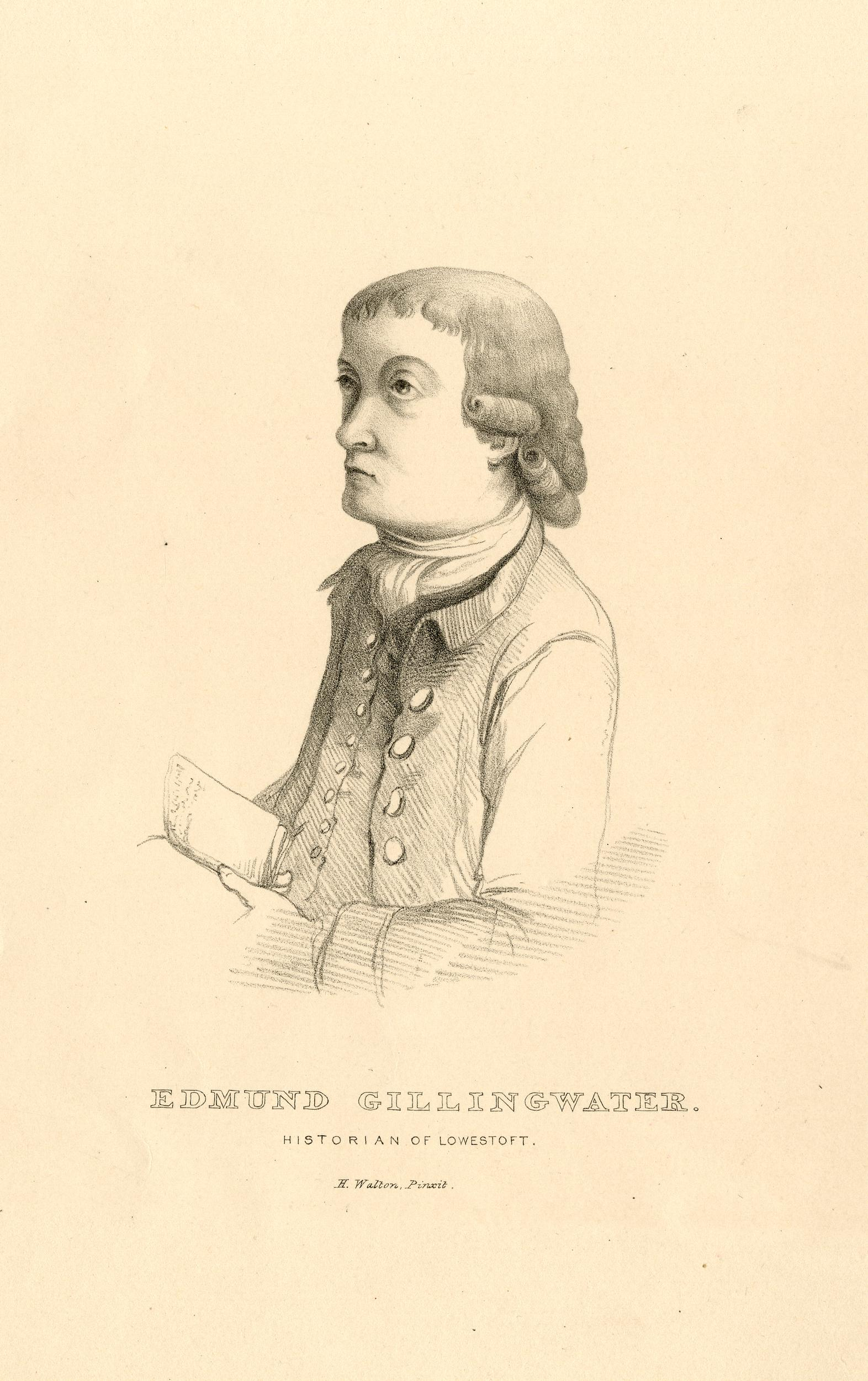
Lithograph, after a portrait by Henry Walton

Edmund Gillingwater (1736 – 13 March 1813) was an English antiquarian, interested in the history of Suffolk and in particular Lowestoft.

== Life ==
Gillingwater was born in Lowestoft, Suffolk, the son of Edmund and Alice Gillingwater, and baptised on 29 December 1736 at St Margaret's Church, Lowestoft. He was apprenticed to a barber. When about twenty-two years of age he moved to Norwich, which he left in December 1761 for Harleston, Norfolk. There he gave up his work as hairdresser, and set up a small business as stationer and bookseller in the Old Market Place. He was appointed an overseer of the poor, publishing in 1786 An Essay on Parish Work-Houses; containing Observations on the present State of English Work-houses; with some Regulations proposed for their improvement.

He married Mary Bond, a widow with sufficient means for Gillingwater to retire from business about 1788 and devote himself to writing. Two years later he brought out by subscription An Historical Account of the ancient Town of Lowestoft in the County of Suffolk. To which is added some cursory remarks on the adjoining parishes and a general account of the Island of Lothingland. It is thought that the author may have been his elder brother Isaac Gillingwater, a barber in Lowestoft.

An Historical and descriptive Account of St. Edmund's Bury... and the Abbey was published by Gillingwater in 1804, with a second edition in 1811. He made considerable collections for a history of Suffolk, consisting chiefly of extracts from printed books. From 1806 to 1810 he was churchwarden of Redenhall with Harleston. He was interested in theology; Samuel Burder, in the preface (p. xiii) of his Oriental Customs (1802), acknowledged his "obligations to Mr Gillingwater, of Harleston in Norfolk, for the very liberal manner in which he favoured him with his manuscript papers", which consisted of additions to, and corrections of, Thomas Harmer's Observations on divers Passages of Scripture.

Gillingwater died on 13 March 1813, aged 77, and was buried in the churchyard of Redenhall with Harleston, beside his wife, who had died on 18 May 1802, aged 65. He left no children. His collections for a history of Suffolk came into the possession of Henry Jermyn of Sibton, who died later the same year, and were then sold at auction.
