= Pillar of Salt (road sign) =

Road sign in Suffolk, England

Coordinates: 52°14′41″N 00°42′57″E

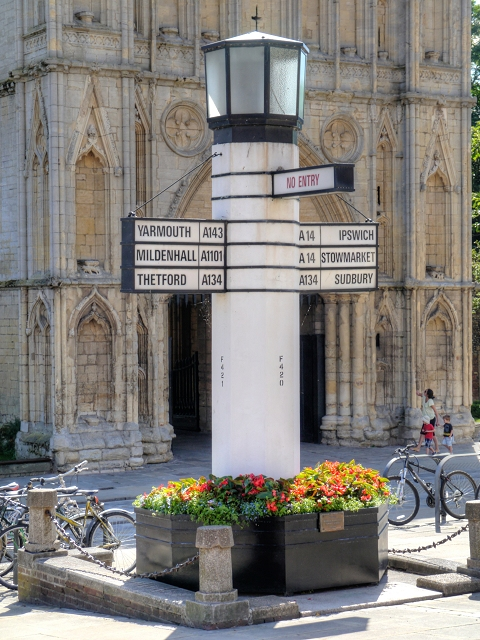
The Pillar of Salt road sign

Pillar of Salt is the name of a Grade II listed road sign on Angel Hill, Bury St Edmunds, Suffolk, England. It was listed in 1998, when it was described as being "individual and probably unique". According to the plaque set at the foot of the sign, it is thought to be the first internally illuminated road sign in the country. Designed by Basil Oliver, architect to Bury St. Edmunds Town Council in 1935, it had to be granted special permission because the height of the letters and numbers did not conform to regulations.

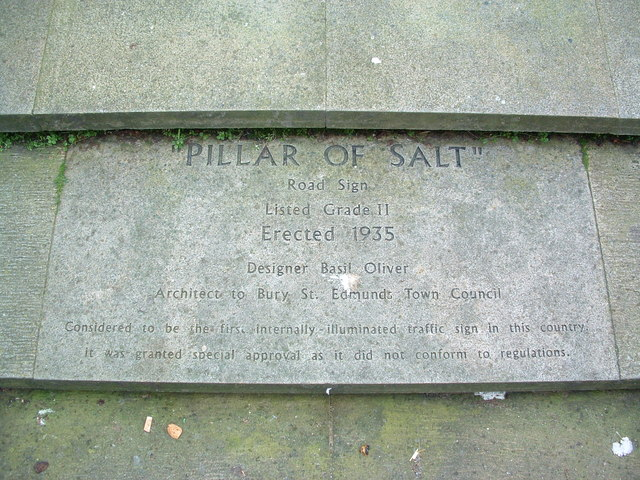
Plaque at the base of the Pillar of Salt
