= Three-finger salute (pro-democracy) =

Hand gesture adopted by protest movements

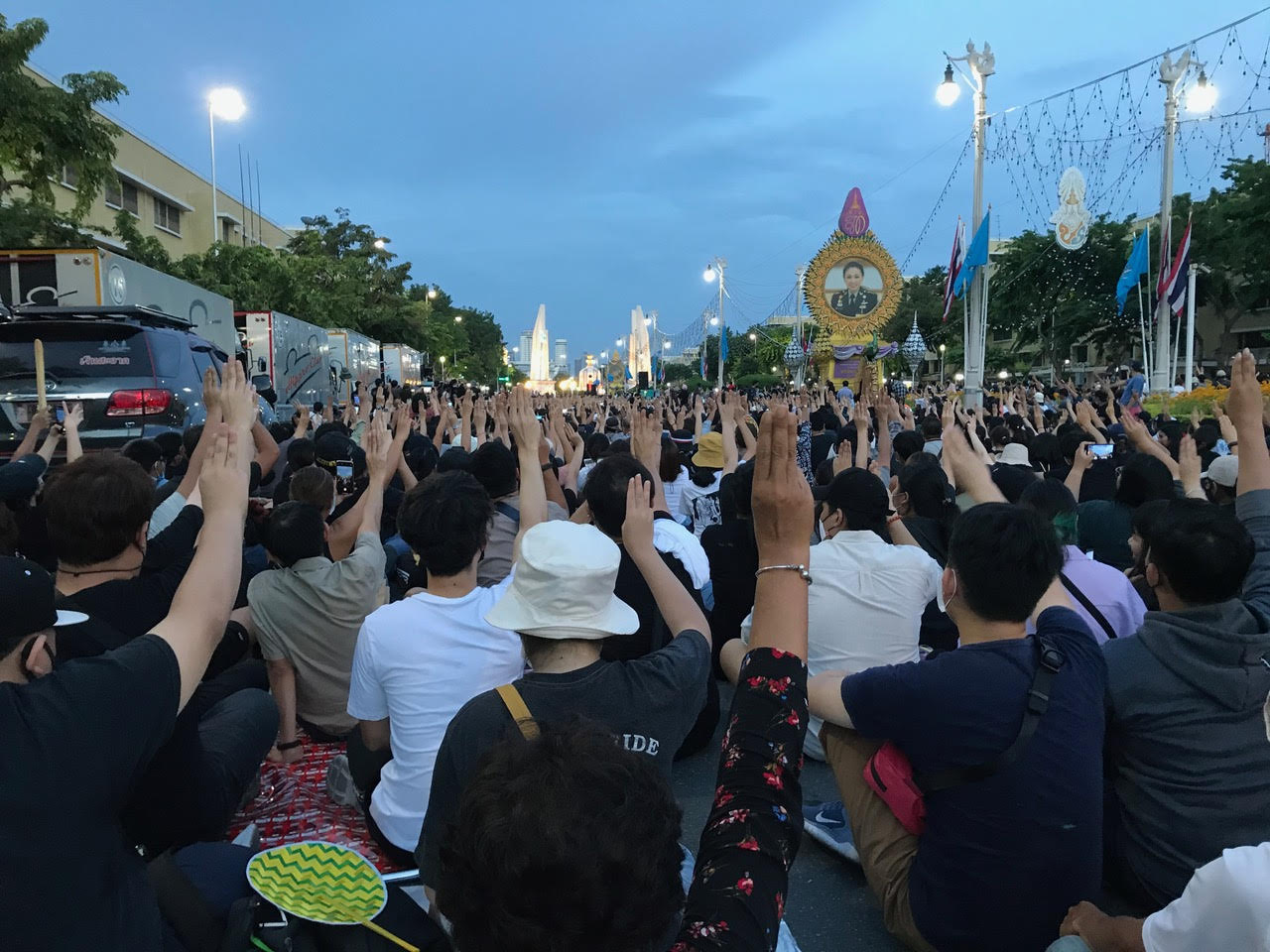
Protesters displaying the three-finger salute in front of the Democracy Monument during the 2020 Thai protests

The three-finger salute is a hand gesture made by raising the index, middle and ring fingers, while holding the thumb to the little finger, and raising the hand with the palm facing out in a salute. The gesture was popularized in the 2010s after its use in The Hunger Games as a symbol of revolution. The gesture has been adopted by protesters, particularly for pro-democracy protest movements in Southeast Asia, mainly in Thailand and Myanmar, as well as in other countries, including Hong Kong.

== Origins ==
The gesture was popularized in the 2010s by The Hunger Games, a series of fiction books and films by Suzanne Collins. It bears resemblance to earlier salutes such as the Scout sign and salute and the Ukrainian salute mimicking the Tryzub symbol, however, it is unclear if these have inspired Collins' version.

In The Hunger Games, the gesture is made by pressing the three middle fingers of the left hand to the lips and then raising it to the air. It initially appears in the first book and film of the series, when the people of District 12 salute Katniss Everdeen after she volunteers to participate in the Hunger Games in place of her sister. Later, in the second part of the series (Catching Fire), an old man in the crowd salutes Katniss this way during a tour by the victors, and the gesture becomes a symbol of the revolution along with the mockingjay song whistled by Katniss in her first games.

== Asian democracy movements ==
=== Thailand ===
The salute first became a real-world pro-democracy symbol in the aftermath of the 2014 Thai coup d'état. Due to its use, the military announced that it would arrest anyone who displayed the salute and that the symbol was made illegal in Thailand. Protesters have since added symbolism to the gesture, stating that the three fingers stand for the French Revolutionary ideal of liberty, equality, fraternity. The gesture was revived by protesters in the 2020–2021 Thai protests.

In response to the 2021 Myanmar coup d'état, a group of about 200 Burmese expatriates and some Thai pro-democracy activists including Parit Chiwarak and Panusaya Sithijirawattanakul protested the coup at the Burmese embassy on Sathon Nuea Road in Bangkok with some protesters reportedly showing the three-finger salute. The protest ended with a police crackdown; two protestors were injured and hospitalised, and two others were arrested.

The trend was sparked by students but has since been adopted by supporters of progressive parties, such as the Move Forward (formerly Future Forward) Party.

=== Hong Kong ===
The salute was used for a time during the Umbrella Movement in 2014 before being revived in the 2019–2020 Hong Kong protests, inspired by its renewed usage in Thailand, and continues to be used to symbolize resistance against the Chinese government.

=== Myanmar ===
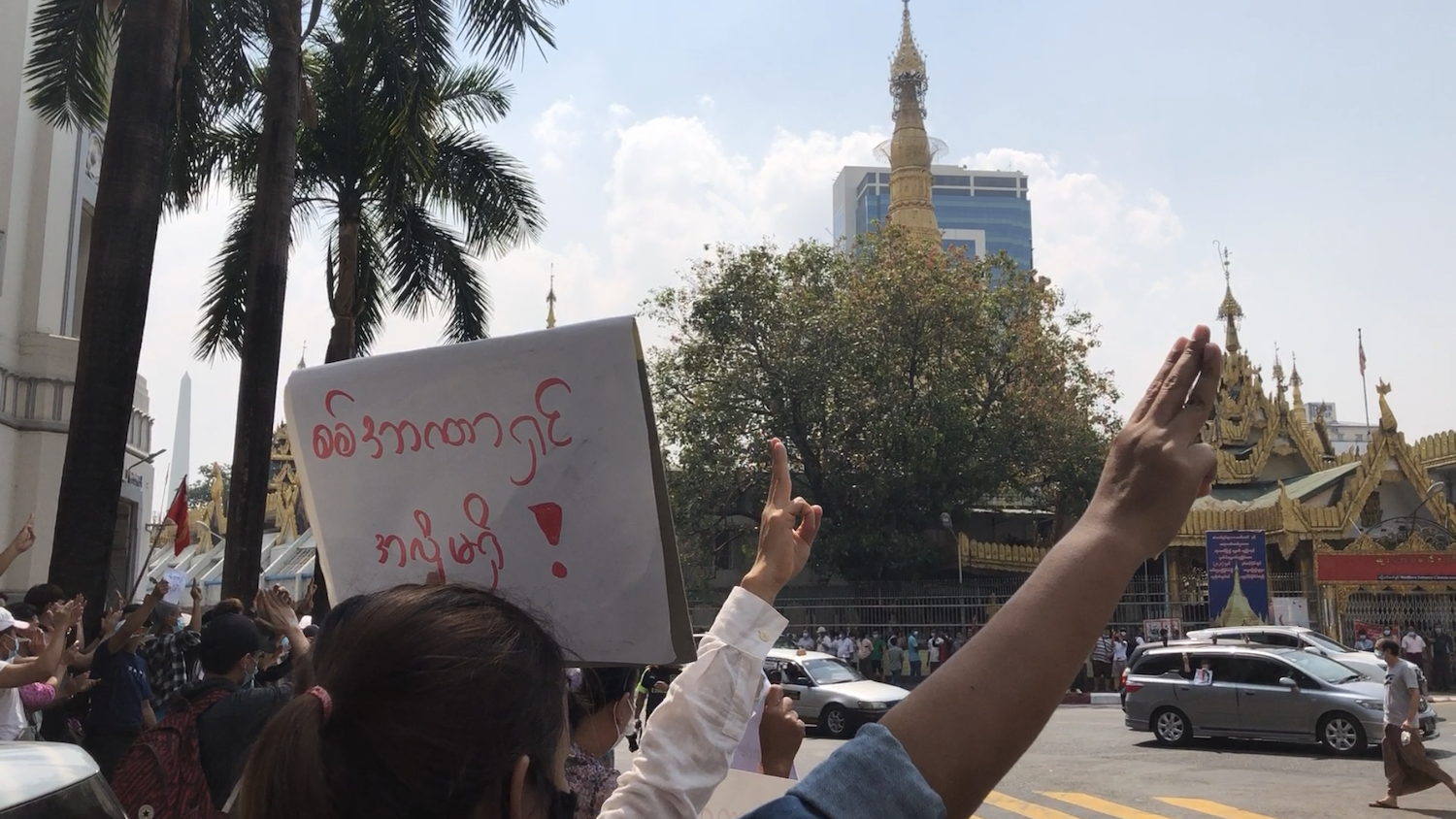
Protestors displaying the three-finger salute near Sule Pagoda in Yangon

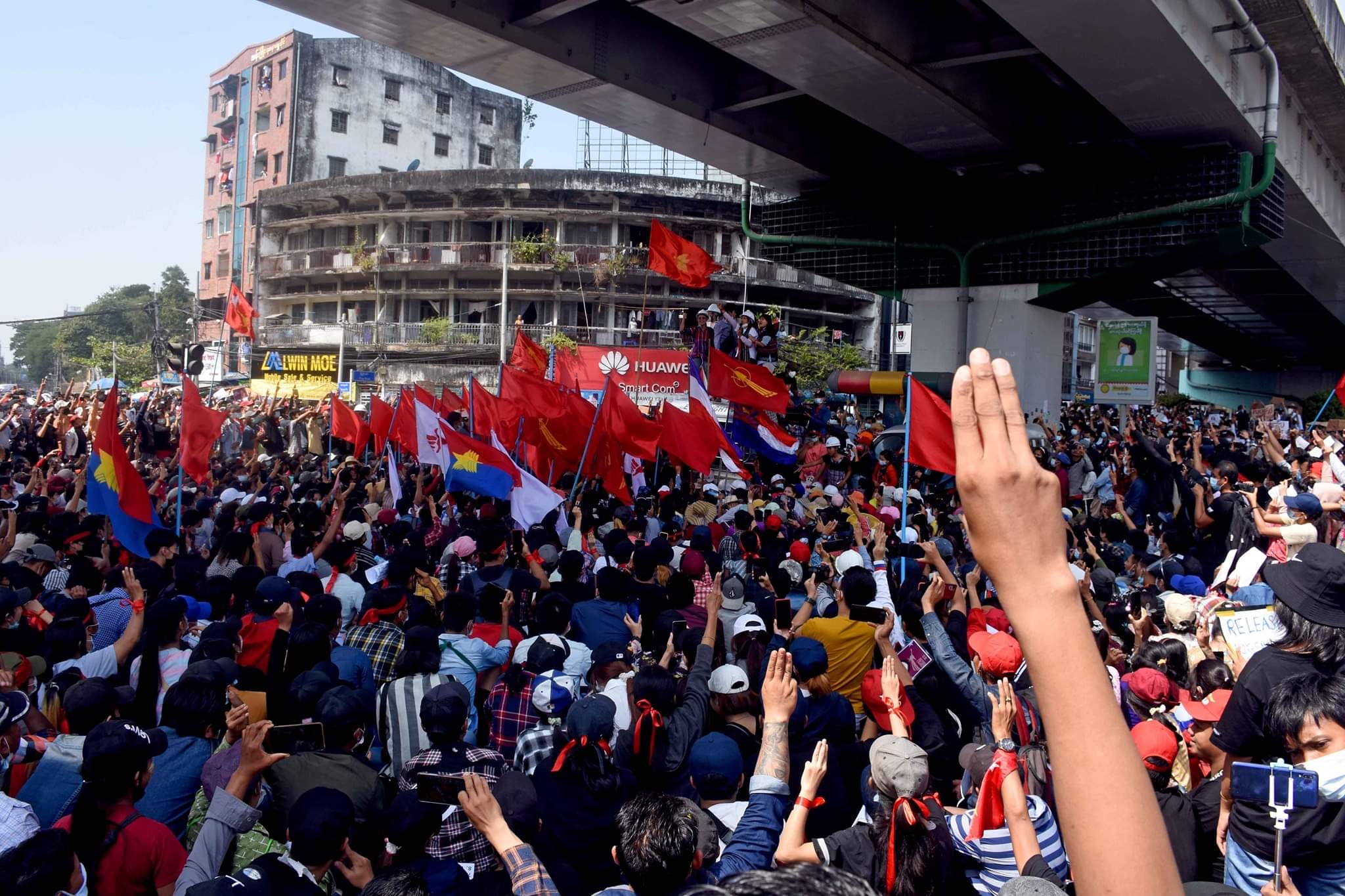
Protesters raising the three-finger salute in Yangon during the 2021 Myanmar protests

The salute became a symbol of opposition to the 2021 Myanmar coup d'état and subsequent civil war. The movement was launched on social media, and many celebrities from Myanmar such as Paing Takhon, who is no longer part of the campaign and Dave Leduc have joined the movement.

=== Cambodia ===
Mu Sochua, former vice president of the Cambodia National Rescue Party, called on the opposition party's supporters to adopt the symbol as a sign of solidarity with Myanmar and as a protest against the current government of Hun Sen and the ruling Cambodian People's Party. A representative of the CPP condemned these actions, saying that they were undermining the country.

== Other uses ==
=== Indonesia ===
In preparation for the 2024 presidential election, the Indonesian Democratic Party of Struggle (PDI-P) supported presidential candidate, Ganjar Pranowo, adopted the all black attire and three-finger salute as his campaign motif and hand gesture, aligned with his and the party's ballot number. On 20 February 2023, a video widely shared on his Twitter account, Ganjar was seen raising his hands in the three-finger salute amidst a crowd of supporters, dressed in all black— reminiscent to pro-democracy protesters seen in Thailand and Hong Kong. The captions In the video reads, "This is not about Ganjar. It's not about power. This is about Indonesia." further stating in the post that the salute signify "Three fingers three promises: Obey God, abide by the law, and be loyal to the people." The change was seen as a significant departure from the PDI-P's Sign of the horns salute, commonly associated to President Joko Widodo's administration.

The thaw in relations between Widodo and his political party is seen as the primary reason for this change, following a controversial constitutional court ruling that allows the nomination of President Jokowi's eldest son, Gibran Rakabuming Raka, as Prabowo Subianto's running mate and given that Gibran's uncle and the Chief Justice of the Constitutional Court, Anwar Usman was also involved in the ruling. Observers view the abrupt choice of the three-finger salute as an act of resistance against perceived unfair democratic processes and abuse of the law. After Ganjar's hand symbol reveal, the Ministry of Home Affairs reminded all civil servants in the Indonesian government to refrain from using any hand symbolism or poses related to presidential candidates, with the consequence of getting fired upon those who do not comply or got caught, even when the gesture was accidental. The ministry stated that the directive aims to ensure neutrality throughout the two-year process of the 2024 general election.

A derivative of the symbol emerged during the election period, where anti-Prabowo elements created a new symbol known as the "Four-finger salute." This gesture combined elements from the three-finger salute, associated with Ganjar's campaign, and adding the index finger symbol, linked to Anies Baswedan's campaign. The fusion of these two symbols was used to represent the united opposition and ideology of both sides against Prabowo's candidacy and Jokowi's perceived political involvement in the election. The General Election Supervisory Agency later deemed the symbol to be a sign under the freedom of expression rather than an election symbol, thus not breaching any rules within the election. The Four-finger salute went viral across social media, and thus created a movement known as the 'Four-finger salute movement' (Indonesian: Gerakan Salam 4 Jari), with the context of using the four finger salute as a symbol of pro-democracy in Indonesia being comparable in usage to the three-finger salute in Myanmar, Thailand, and Hong Kong. Supporters of the Four-finger salute movement rejects the formation of a political family and the perceived degradation of democracy in Indonesia. The main goal of the movement rallies for the creation of a second round in the presidential election and to lower Prabowo's electibility.

=== Philippines ===
Before its adoption as a pro-democracy symbol, Philippine senator Miriam Defensor Santiago used it in a 2013 privilege speech in response to then-Senate president Juan Ponce Enrile, criticizing his personal and political conduct dating back to Ferdinand Marcos's regime, in response to his allegations about her mental health. In this context, she deviated from her prepared remarks after declaring, "His mind is sick, sick, sick...[You are] three times sick!" using the language of Katniss Everdeen in The Hunger Games: Catching Fire.

In 2017, a group of critics of President Rodrigo Duterte also used the salute to express dissent towards his administration and the killings related to the country's war on drugs.

=== United States ===
The nonprofit organization Harry Potter Alliance used the three-finger salute to criticize economic and wage inequality in American companies such as Walmart and McDonald's. The move was supported by the AFL-CIO, who responded by posting pictures of union leaders posing with the symbol.

== Similar gestures ==
=== Scout sign ===
The Scout sign

The Hunger Games salute bears resemblance to the earlier Scout sign, used since 1908 to represent the three parts of the Scout Promise. Though Collins does not cite it as an inspiration, researcher An Xiao Mina has noted the resemblance's significance in driving the gesture's recognition.

=== Ukraine ===
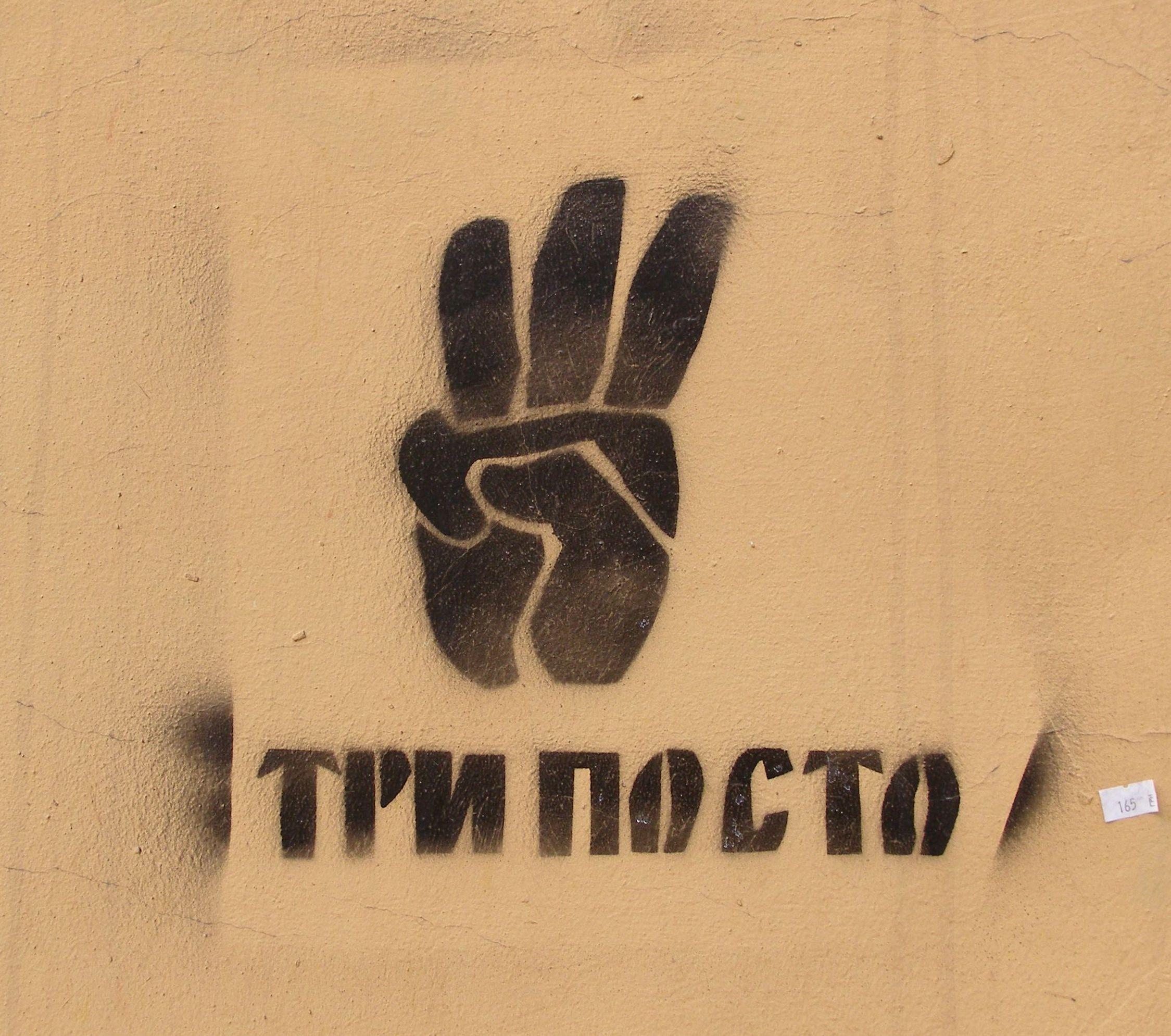
Ukrainian three-fingers salute used by the Svoboda party as a homage to the 'Tryzub' pro-independence gesture of the late 1980s

The salute is also somewhat similar to a three-fingered hand salute from Ukraine, though the latter is done with fingers spread out rather than close together. It symbolizes the Tryzub, as for example in pro-independence demonstrations in the late 1980s and in the logo of the Ukrainian nationalist Svoboda party.

== See also ==
- Rabia sign, similar gesture with four fingers
- Milk Tea Alliance, a democratic solidarity movement in Thailand, Taiwan, Hong Kong, and Myanmar
- Shadow government (conspiracy theory)
