= Catching Fire =

2009 novel by Suzanne Collins

- North American first edition cover
- Author: Suzanne Collins
- Cover artist: Tim O'Brien
- Language: English
- Series: The Hunger Games
- Genre: Dystopian; Science fiction
- Publisher: Scholastic
- Publication date: September 1, 2009
- Publication place: United States
- Media type: Print (Hardcover, Paperback)
- Pages: 391
- ISBN: 978-0-545-22724-7
- OCLC: 288932790
- Dewey Decimal: [Fic] 22
- LC Class: PZ7.C6837 Cat 2009
- Preceded by: The Hunger Games
- Followed by: Mockingjay

Catching Fire is a 2009 dystopian young adult fiction novel by the American novelist Suzanne Collins, the second book in The Hunger Games series. As the sequel to the 2008 bestseller The Hunger Games, it continues the story of a now 17-year-old Katniss Everdeen and the post-apocalyptic nation of Panem. Following the events of the previous novel, a rebellion against the oppressive Capitol has begun, and Katniss and fellow tribute Peeta Mellark are forced to return to the arena in a special edition of the Hunger Games.

The book was first published on September 1, 2009, by Scholastic, in hardcover, and was later released in ebook and audiobook format. Catching Fire received mostly positive reviews, with reviewers praising Collins' prose, the book's ending, and the development of Katniss's character. According to critics, major themes of the novel include survival, authoritarianism, rebellion and interdependence versus independence. The book has sold more than 19 million copies in the U.S. alone. A film adaptation, The Hunger Games: Catching Fire, was released on November 22, 2013.

== Plot ==
Six months after winning the 74th Hunger Games, Katniss Everdeen and Peeta Mellark have returned home to District 12, the poorest sector of Panem. Prior to Katniss and Peeta's "Victory Tour" of the country, President Snow visits Katniss and tells her that her televised acts of defiance in the previous Games have inspired rebellion among the districts. Snow demands that Katniss convince the country that she was acting out of love for Peeta, not against the Capitol, or her family and best friend Gale Hawthorne will be executed. Katniss reveals this threat to her mentor, Haymitch Abernathy, but not to Peeta.

The tour's first stop is District 11, home of Katniss's Hunger Games ally Rue. Peeta announces that he will give part of his winnings to the families of Rue and fellow tribute Thresh, and Katniss delivers an impromptu, heartfelt speech expressing her gratitude to the fallen tributes. An old man salutes Katniss, joined by the crowd; to her horror, the old man is immediately executed. Katniss tells Peeta of Snow's threat, and they continue the tour as normal. Hoping to placate Snow, Peeta proposes to Katniss during a televised interview in the Capitol, which she accepts. However, Snow remains dissatisfied with her performance, leaving her afraid for her loved ones.

Returning to District 12, now overrun with harsher Peacekeepers to enforce the Capitol's rule, Gale is caught poaching and is publicly whipped until Haymitch intervenes. While hunting in the woods, Katniss encounters Bonnie and Twill, refugees from District 8, whose uprising has failed. Bonnie and Twill plan to reach District 13 – believed to be destroyed in the first rebellion against the Capitol – hoping that the residents are actually underground. Katniss is injured climbing back over District 12's now live electric fence. Preparing for her upcoming wedding, Katniss learns that Districts 3 and 4 have also risen up against the Capitol.

The Capitol announces the 75th Hunger Games with a twist – tributes will be selected from the surviving victors of the previous Games. As District 12's sole female victor, Katniss has to compete alongside either Haymitch or Peeta. Haymitch is chosen and is unable to stop Peeta from volunteering in his place. At the Capitol, Haymitch urges Katniss to find allies, but she bonds with the weakest tributes. In the televised interview, Katniss's stylist Cinna has Katniss' wedding gown transformed into a black dress of feathers resembling a mockingjay. Trying to stop the Games, Peeta lies in the interview that Katniss is pregnant. Before Katniss is sent into the arena, she watches helplessly as Cinna is beaten and dragged out by Peacekeepers.

Katniss and Peeta ally themselves with Finnick Odair from District 4 and Mags, his 80-year-old mentor. Peeta is nearly killed by the jungle arena's force field, and the party later has to flee from a poisonous fog. Mags sacrifices herself to allow Finnick to save the weakened Peeta. Katniss and Peeta ally with Johanna Mason from District 7 and "exceptionally smart" Beetee and Wiress from District 3. Wiress reveals that the arena is arranged like a clock, with each danger occurring at a fixed time and place for one hour. Wiress is killed, and in retaliation Katniss and Johanna kill the District 1 victors Gloss and Cashmere. The remaining members of Katniss's group work on Beetee's plan to harness lightning to electrocute the District 2 victors, who later interfere and disrupt the plan. Katniss uses her bow and arrow to direct the lightning into the force field, destroying it and knocking her unconscious.

Katniss wakes up en route to District 13 with Finnick, Beetee, and Haymitch. She learns from Haymitch and Plutarch Heavensbee, the Head Gamemaker, that there had been a secret plan to rescue Katniss, now the living symbol of the rebellion. Peeta, along with Johanna and District 2 tribute Enobaria, have been captured by the Capitol. She later learns from Gale that, though her family and some other residents have escaped, District 12 has been destroyed.

== Themes ==
The main themes of Catching Fire include survival, sacrifice, and the conflict between interdependence and independence. As reviewer Margo Dill noted, "In [Catching Fire], Katniss and Peeta are definitely interdependent. They are both helping each other to survive. As a matter of fact, they want the other one to survive more than they do themselves." Dill goes on to explain how this likely increases the chances of each character dying.

Government control is another important theme, both within the book and throughout the entire trilogy. After suppressing the first rebellion, the Capitol establishes rules in order to restrict and control the citizens' lives. Examples noted by Dill include that, "the 75th annual Hunger Games have 'new' rules that cause Katniss and Peeta to be in danger once again. More 'Peacekeepers' are placed in districts to diminish any hope that the citizens started to have after the last Hunger Games." Another major theme throughout the trilogy is the media and the influence or power that popular culture has over the emotions, wishes and views of society. Other themes in the book include morality, obedience, sacrifice, redemption, love, and law.

== Publication history ==
Catching Fire had a preliminary hardcover release date of September 8, 2009, which was moved up to September 1 in response to requests by retailers to move the release to before Labor Day and the start of school for many readers. It was also published as an audiobook on the same day. Advance reading copies were available at BookExpo America in New York City, and were sent out to some booksellers, and offered as prizes in Scholastic's "How Would You Survive" writing contest in May 2009. An eBook version was also published on June 3, 2010. Catching Fire had an initial print of 350,000 copies, a number which had grown to over 750,000 by February 2010. The release of Mockingjay, the third novel of the series, followed on August 24, 2010. As of March 2012, the book has sold over 10 million copies.

== Critical reception ==
Publishers Weekly wrote, "If this second installment spends too much time recapping events from book one, it doesn't disappoint when it segues into the pulse-pounding action readers have come to expect." Booklist commented on how the "unadorned prose provides an open window to perfect pacing and electrifying world building". The New York Times also gave a positive review, writing, "Collins has done that rare thing. She has written a sequel that improves upon the first book. As a reader, I felt excited and even hopeful: could it be that this series and its characters were actually going somewhere?" The review also praised Collins' development of the character of Katniss. The Plain Dealer wrote, "The very last sentence of Catching Fire will leave readers gasping. Not to mention primed for part three."

However, not all reviews were positive. The same review from The Plain Dealer expressed displeasure at how, "after 150 pages of romantic dithering, I was tapping my foot to move on." A review from Entertainment Weekly opined that the book was weaker than the first and wrote, "Katniss pretends to be in love with her sweet-natured Games teammate Peeta Mellark, but she secretly pines for brooding Gale, a childhood friend. Except — why? There's little distinction between the two thinly imagined guys, other than the fact that Peeta has a dopier name. Collins conjures none of the erotic energy that makes Twilight, for instance, so creepily alluring."

In addition, Time magazine placed Catching Fire at number four on its list of the top 100 fiction books of 2009, while People magazine rated it the eighth Best Book of 2009. It also won the Publishers Weekly's 2009 award for Best Book of the Year.

== Film adaptation ==
Lionsgate announced that The Hunger Games: Catching Fire was to be released on November 22, 2013, as a sequel to the film adaptation of The Hunger Games. In April 2012, it was announced that Gary Ross, director of The Hunger Games, would not return due to a "tight" and "fitted" schedule. Francis Lawrence was officially announced as the director for Catching Fire on May 3, 2012. In addition to the returning cast members from the first film, the film's new cast includes Jena Malone as Johanna Mason, Philip Seymour Hoffman as Plutarch Heavensbee, Lynn Cohen as Mags, Alan Ritchson as Gloss, Sam Claflin as Finnick, and Jeffrey Wright as Beetee. Production officially began on September 10, 2012, and concluded on December 21, 2012. Shooting first took place in and around metropolitan Atlanta. Several District 11 scenes were also filmed in the rural areas of Macon County, Georgia, and the rest of production took place in Hawaii. Some of the wooded scenes were filmed in Oakland, New Jersey.

The film was successful, grossing more than $800 million to become the fifth highest-grossing film at the box office in 2013 and receiving positive reviews from critics. It would be followed by the two part film adaptation of the third novel, Mockingjay, released on November 21, 2014 (Part 1) and November 20, 2015 (Part 2).
