= Portrait of Meghan Markle =

Painting by Tim O'Brien

Tim O'Brien, Meghan Markle, 2018

Portrait of Meghan Markle is a 2018 painting by the American artist Tim O'Brien depicting Meghan, Duchess of Sussex.

== Description ==
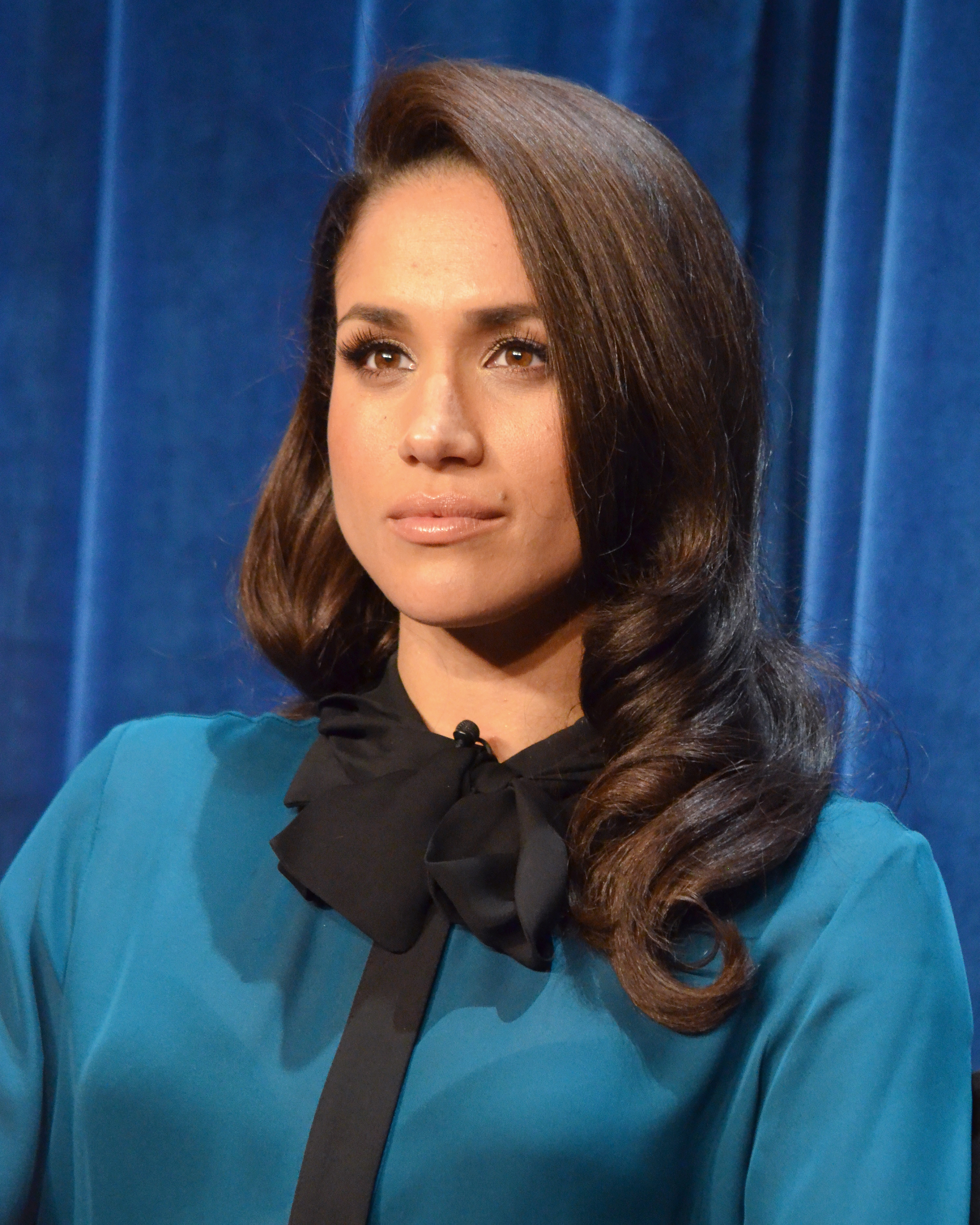
Markle in 2013. The image was used as a reference on which the portrait is based.

The painting was commissioned by two creative directors for the summer 2018 cover of The Key magazine, published by Kappa Kappa Gamma sorority of which Markle had been a member. Once the sketches were approved, he produced an oil painting over the course of several days. In the portrait, Markle is depicted in a Victorian-like atmosphere, donning a tiara, pearl necklaces with multiple strands, and a frilly gown wrapped in a fur shawl.

In a video message for the Brit Awards 2019, The Carters accepted the award for the Best International Group in front of a copy of O'Brien's portrait of Markle. O'Brien later stated that he was not approached before the duo, consisting of Beyoncé and Jay-Z, decided to use the portrait in their video message.
