= Mockingjay =

2010 novel by Suzanne Collins

- North American first edition cover
- Author: Suzanne Collins
- Cover artist: Tim O'Brien
- Language: English
- Series: The Hunger Games
- Genre: Adventure; War; Science fiction; Action Thriller
- Publisher: Scholastic
- Publication date: August 24, 2010
- Publication place: United States
- Pages: 390
- ISBN: 978-0-439-02351-1
- OCLC: 522512199
- Dewey Decimal: [Fic] 22
- LC Class: PZ7.C6837 Moc 2010
- Preceded by: Catching Fire

Mockingjay is a 2010 dystopian young adult fiction novel by American author Suzanne Collins. It is chronologically the last installment of The Hunger Games series, following 2008's The Hunger Games and 2009's Catching Fire. The book concludes the story of Katniss Everdeen, who agrees to unify the districts of Panem in a rebellion against the tyrannical Capitol.

The hardcover and audiobook editions of Mockingjay were published by Scholastic on August 24, 2010, six days after the ebook edition went on sale. The book sold 450,000 copies in the first week of release, exceeding the publisher's expectations. It received critical acclaim. The book was adapted into two films, with the first released on November 21, 2014, and the second released on November 20, 2015.

== Inspiration and development ==
Collins has said that the main inspiration for The Hunger Games series came from the classical account of Theseus and the Minotaur. In Greek mythology, as a punishment for the killing of King Minos's son Androgeos, Athens was forced to sacrifice seven youths and seven maidens to Crete, who were then put in the Labyrinth and killed by the Minotaur. After a while, Theseus, the son of the Athenian king, decided to put an end to the Minotaur and Minos's terror, so he volunteered to join the third group of victims, ultimately killing the Minotaur and leading his companions out of the monster's Labyrinth.

Collins has said that there are also many parallels between the Roman Empire and the fictional nation of Panem. She describes the Hunger Games as "an updated version of the Roman gladiator games, which entails a ruthless government forcing people to fight to the death as popular entertainment." Collins also explains that the name "Panem" came from the Latin phrase "Panem et Circenses", which means "Bread and Circuses" and refers to the strategy used by Roman emperors to appease the masses by providing them with food and entertainment (Juvenal, Satires, 10.81).

As with the previous books in the trilogy, Mockingjay contains 27 chapters, with nine chapters in each of the three parts. This structure, which Collins had previously used in her series The Underland Chronicles, came from Collins's playwriting background. This "three-act" structure is also apparent in the trilogy as a whole; Collins stated that she "knew from the beginning" that she was going to write a trilogy.

The cover and title information was revealed by Scholastic on February 11, 2010. The cover continues the previous books' theme on the symbol of peace. The novel's title comes from the hybrid birds of the same name that feature in the novels' storyline. As Publishers Weekly has stated, "the hybrid birds that are an important symbol—of hope and rebellion—throughout the books". Collins likens Katniss to a Mockingjay because both "should never have existed".

== Plot ==
Following Catching Fire, Katniss Everdeen adjusts to life underground in District 13, headquarters of the rebellion in Panem. Her mother, her sister Primrose, her mentor Haymitch Abernathy, and her friend Gale Hawthorne are among refugees from District 12 now resettled in 13, as well as fellow former Hunger Games victors Finnick Odair and Beetee Latier. Katniss reluctantly agrees to be the "Mockingjay" – the symbol of the rebellion – for rebel propaganda, on the condition that District 13's President Alma Coin grants immunity to all surviving Hunger Games tributes, including Peeta Mellark and Finnick's lover Annie Cresta, who have been captured by the Capitol.

Struggling to perform convincingly in a studio, Katniss is sent to a rebel hospital in District 8 to film. When an air raid begins, she disobeys orders and joins in the fighting, giving an impassioned televised speech. The Capitol tortures Peeta to demoralize Katniss and televises interviews with him in which he is visibly deteriorating, but still manages to warn the rebels of an impending attack. A rescue team manages to extract Peeta along with Annie and fellow Quarter Quell tribute Johanna Mason, but on their first reunion Peeta attempts to strangle Katniss. The rebels discover that Peeta has been brainwashed through a method called "hijacking", implanting false memories and torturing him to believe Katniss is evil and that their previous relationship was completely fake.

While medics and friends from District 12 attempt to rehabilitate Peeta, Katniss withdraws from him and rededicates herself to the war effort. She and Gale are sent to District 2, one of the Capitol's last strongholds, where she struggles with the rebels' methods and indifference to suffering in the pursuit of their goals. She attempts to save a District 2 soldier escaping the rebels' trap, and is shot on live television. As the rebels close in, Katniss is assigned to a squad and sent with a film crew to shoot combat in the Capitol. When President Coin sends Peeta, who is still dangerous and unpredictable, to join them, Katniss suspects Coin wants her dead, and decides to break away from the group to infiltrate the Capitol and kill Panem's leader, President Coriolanus Snow. The group's leader, Boggs, is killed and transfers command to Katniss, and her squad agrees to carry out her plan. In the ensuing urban warfare, many of Katniss's squad are killed, including Finnick, who is devoured by genetically modified reptiles. As they reach Snow's presidential mansion, a hovercraft bearing Capitol insignia drops bombs disguised as humanitarian aid, some of which explode immediately, into a group of children being used as human shields. Rebel medics, including Primrose, rush in to help the injured children, but the remaining bombs detonate, killing Primrose and severely burning Katniss.

As she recovers, Katniss, profoundly depressed over Primrose's death, learns the rebels sacked the Capitol the day of the bombing, and Coin, who now leads Panem, promises her the chance to publicly execute Snow. Katniss confronts Snow, who claims that Coin orchestrated the bombing of the children to turn his remaining supporters against him, and that District 13 under Coin has been using the rebellion to turn the other districts against each other and thereby facilitate power for District 13. Katniss realizes that the double-wave bombing was similar to a tactic previously suggested by Gale and Beetee, and begins to harbor doubts about Coin. Coin hosts a referendum for the remaining Victors, proposing to host a final Hunger Games with only children from the Capitol; the proposal passes, with Katniss voting in favor and Peeta emphatically opposing the idea. Immediately afterward, at Snow's execution, Katniss is supposed to carry out the death sentence by shooting him with her bow, but at the last second, she instead shoots and kills Coin. Snow dies in the resulting chaos, though the cause of his death is left unclear. Katniss attempts to kill herself with a suicide pill, but is stopped by Peeta and arrested.

In the aftermath of the war, rebel Commander Paylor of District 8 is voted President in Coin's place. Katniss is acquitted of murder by reason of insanity and sent home to District 12 alongside Haymitch and Peeta, while her mother and Gale live in other districts supporting the post-war rehabilitation efforts. Peeta slowly recovers his memories and sanity, and eventually starts a genuine relationship with Katniss. Twenty years later, Katniss and Peeta are married and have two children. Under Paylor's administration, the Hunger Games are abolished, with the arenas replaced by memorials. Katniss has found peace in her new life, but still dreads the day her children learn about their parents' involvement in the war and the Games. She comforts her young daughter with a game, in which she reminds herself of every good thing she has ever seen someone do.

== Themes ==
Reviews have noted many themes in the previous books that are also explored in Mockingjay. A review from The Baltimore Sun noted that "the themes of the series, including physical hardships, loyalty in extreme circumstances and traversing morally ambiguous terrain, are continued at an even larger scale." In the book, Katniss must deal with betrayal and violence against people. At the same time, while she was symbolically touching thousands of lives, she must also lead those people into war. Finally, Katniss realizes she cannot even trust President Coin, leader of District 13.

In an interview with Collins, it was noted that the series "tackles issues like severe poverty, starvation, oppression, and the effects of war." Collins replied that this inspiration was from her father, who, when going to war in Vietnam, made sure that his children understood the consequences and effects of war. Yvonne Zipp of The Christian Science Monitor noted that it was "the most brutal of the trilogy" and that "Collins doesn't take war lightly – her characters debate the morality involved in tactics used to try to overthrow the rotting, immoral government, and they pay a high cost for those tactics." Katie Roiphe of The New York Times wrote that "it is the perfect teenage story with its exquisitely refined rage against the cruel and arbitrary power of the adult world." In a review for USA Today, Bob Minzesheimer pointed out that the novel contained optimism: "Hope emerges from despair. Even in a dystopian future, there's a better future."

Minzesheimer also noted a central question of "Real or not real?" which was asked throughout the novel by Peeta. Susan Carpenter of the Los Angeles Times also pointed this out, writing, "Mockingjay takes readers into new territories and an even more brutal and confusing world: one where it's unclear what sides the characters are on, one where presumed loyalties are repeatedly stood on their head".

== Publication history ==
Mockingjay was first released in the US and Canada on August 24, 2010. The UK, New Zealand and Australia received the book one day later, on August 25, 2010. The audiobook was released simultaneously on August 24, 2010, by Scholastic Audio.

=== Sales ===
The book had a 1.2 million-copy first printing that was bumped up from 750,000. In its first week of release, the book sold over 450,000 copies. Following this, Scholastic printed an additional 400,000 copies, bringing the initial print run up to 1.6 million. Scholastic Trade president Ellie Berger said that sales "have exceeded all expectations". The book has also been released in e-book format and topped sales in the week ending with August 29, 2010, beating out The Girl with the Dragon Tattoo, which had held the top spot since April. The other Hunger Games books have also made it in the top ten, with the first book at fifth and the second book taking eighth. As of March 2012, the book has sold over 9 million copies.

== Release ==
=== Promotion ===
To promote the release of Mockingjay, many bookstores held midnight release parties. The official event in New York City was attended by Collins, and included many activities such as a tarot card reader, a magician, jugglers and face-painters. Prizes such as signed copies of Catching Fire and Hunger Games-themed cups were raffled. Once Collins arrived, she read the first chapter of the novel, explaining that she would read with an accent since Katniss, the narrator, is from Appalachia. By midnight, copies were being sold with a signature stamp since Collins had a hand injury and was unable to sign.

Before the release, Scholastic also released a trailer for the book, launched a Facebook page that gained over 22,000 fans in 10 days, and held a contest for booksellers to win a visit from Collins and an online countdown clock to the release date. There were also advertisements for the book on websites such as Entertainment Weekly and Romantic Times. National Entertainment Collectibles Association also sold other goods such as T-shirts, posters, games and bracelets. Collins also held a "13-District Blog Tour" where 13 winners received a free copy of Mockingjay on August 24, 2010. A tour was also scheduled, starting at Books of Wonder in New York where the official party took place. The tour ended on November 6, 2010, in the Third Place Books store in Lake Forest Park, Washington.

=== Critical reception ===
Publishers Weekly gave the book a starred review, calling it "the best yet, a beautifully orchestrated and intelligent novel that succeeds on every level". The review went on to praise the "sharp social commentary and the nifty world building". Nicole Sperling of Entertainment Weekly gave the book a B+ and said, "Collins has kicked the brutal violence up a notch in an edge-of-your-seat plot". Kirkus Reviews gave Mockingjay a starred review, saying that the novel is exactly what its fans are looking for and that "it will grab them and not let go". Susan Carpenter of the Los Angeles Times compared the battlefield to Iraq and said that the book is every bit as original as the first in the series, ending the review with "Wow".

The Baltimore Sun's Nancy Knight commented that the book "ends on an ostensibly happy note, but the heartbreaking effects of war and loss aren't sugar-coated" and that it will have readers thinking about the effects of war on society. Katie Roiphe of The New York Times said it is "the perfect teenage story with its exquisitely refined rage against the cruel and arbitrary power of the adult world". However, she criticized that it was not as "impeccably plotted" as The Hunger Games. Bob Minzesheimer of USA Today gave the book three out of four stars. The Christian Science Monitor reviewer Yvonne Zipp described it as "an entirely gripping read".

Some critics noted that there was a suspense drop between Catching Fire and the start of Mockingjay. While a review from The Sacramento Bee praised the action scenes and the battle in the Capitol, the reviewer also criticized Collins for not giving enough time to finish all the loose ends, writing that "the disappointment with Mockingjay hits primarily as Collins starts her home stretch. It's almost as if she didn't allocate enough time or chapters to handle all her threads".

== Film adaptation ==
The Hunger Games trilogy was adapted into a series of films, with the stars of the 2012 film The Hunger Games signed on for all of them. Mockingjay was split into two parts; Part 1 was released on November 21, 2014, and Part 2 was released on November 20, 2015. Francis Lawrence, director of The Hunger Games: Catching Fire, returned to direct the two films. Julianne Moore played President Coin.

== See also ==
- The Ballad of Songbirds and Snakes – 2020 novel by Suzanne Collins
- Sunrise on the Reaping - 2025 novel by Suzanne Collins
