= The Hunger Games (disambiguation) =

The Hunger Games is a trilogy of adventure novels by Suzanne Collins.

The Hunger Games may also refer to:

- The Hunger Games (novel), the first novel in the trilogy
- The Hunger Games (franchise), the media franchise based on the novels
  - The Hunger Games (film), the first film in the series
    - The Hunger Games: Songs from District 12 and Beyond, the soundtrack to the first film
