= Critics' Choice Movie Award for Best Actress in an Action Movie =

Award given by the Broadcast Film Critics Association

- Awarded for: Best Performance by an Actress in an Action Movie
- Location: Los Angeles, California
- Presented by: Broadcast Film Critics Association
- Final award: Rebecca Ferguson for Mission: Impossible – Dead Reckoning Part One (2023)
- Website: www.criticschoice.com

The Critics' Choice Movie Award for Best Actress in an Action Movie is a category presented by the Critics Choice Association at the annual Critics' Choice Movie Awards. It was awarded from 2012 to 2016 and later revived in 2020 as part of the inaugural Critics' Choice Super Awards.

== Superlatives ==
=== Multiple nominees ===
Nominations	Recipient
4	Jennifer Lawrence
3	Emily Blunt
2	Scarlett Johansson, Joey King, Sandra Bullock, Rebecca Ferguson

== List of winners and nominees ==
=== 2010s ===
Year	Actress	Character	Film	Distributor	Ref.
2012	Jennifer Lawrence	Katniss Everdeen	The Hunger Games	Lionsgate	
2012	Emily Blunt	Sara	Looper	TriStar Pictures	
2012	Gina Carano	Mallory Kane	Haywire	Relativity Media	
2012	Judi Dench	M	Skyfall	Sony Pictures Releasing	
2012	Anne Hathaway	Selina Kyle / Catwoman	The Dark Knight Rises	Warner Bros. Pictures	
2013	Sandra Bullock	Dr. Ryan Stone	Gravity	Warner Bros. Pictures	
2013	Jennifer Lawrence	Katniss Everdeen	The Hunger Games: Catching Fire	Lionsgate Films	
2013	Evangeline Lilly	Tauriel	The Hobbit: The Desolation of Smaug	Warner Bros. Pictures	
2013	Gwyneth Paltrow	Pepper Potts	Iron Man 3	Walt Disney Studios Motion Pictures	
2014	Emily Blunt	Rita Vrataski	Edge of Tomorrow	Warner Bros. Pictures	
2014	Scarlett Johansson	Lucy	Lucy	Universal Pictures	
2014	Jennifer Lawrence	Katniss Everdeen	The Hunger Games: Mockingjay – Part 1	Lionsgate Films	
2014	Zoe Saldaña	Gamora	Guardians of the Galaxy	Walt Disney Studios Motion Pictures	
2014	Shailene Woodley	Beatrice "Tris" Prior	Divergent	Lionsgate	
2015	Charlize Theron	Imperator Furiosa	Mad Max: Fury Road	Warner Bros. Pictures	
2015	Emily Blunt	Kate Macer	Sicario	Lionsgate	
2015	Rebecca Ferguson	Ilsa Faust	Mission: Impossible – Rogue Nation	Paramount Pictures	
2015	Bryce Dallas Howard	Claire Dearing	Jurassic World	Universal Pictures	
2015	Jennifer Lawrence	Katniss Everdeen	The Hunger Games: Mockingjay – Part 2	Lionsgate Films	
2016	Margot Robbie	Harleen Quinzel / Harley Quinn	Suicide Squad	Warner Bros.	
2016	Gal Gadot	Diana Prince / Wonder Woman	Batman v Superman: Dawn of Justice	Warner Bros.	
2016	Scarlett Johansson	Natasha Romanova / Black Widow	Captain America: Civil War	Walt Disney Studios Motion Pictures	
2016	Tilda Swinton	The Ancient One	Doctor Strange	Walt Disney Studios Motion Pictures	

=== 2020s ===
Year	Actress	Character	Film	Distributor	Ref.
2020	Betty Gilpin	Crystal Creasy	The Hunt	Universal Pictures	
2020	Yifei Liu	Mulan	Mulan	Disney+	
2020	Blake Lively	Stephanie Patrick	The Rhythm Section	Paramount Pictures	
2020	Iliza Shlesinger	Cissy Davis	Spenser Confidential	Netflix	
2020	Hilary Swank	Athena Stone	The Hunt	Universal Pictures	
2021	Jodie Comer	Marguerite de Carrouges	The Last Duel	20th Century Studios	
2021	Ana de Armas	Paloma	No Time to Die	MGM	
2021	Karen Gillan	Sam	Gunpowder Milkshake	Netflix	
2021	Regina King	Trudy Smith	The Harder They Fall	Netflix	
2021	Lashana Lynch	Nomi	No Time to Die	MGM	
2021	Maggie Q	Anna Dutton	The Protégé	Lionsgate	
2022	Viola Davis	General Nanisca	The Woman King	TriStar Pictures	
2022	Sandra Bullock	Loretta Sage	The Lost City	Paramount Pictures	
2022	Jennifer Connelly	Penelope "Penny" Benjamin	Top Gun: Maverick	Paramount Pictures	
2022	Joey King	The Prince	Bullet Train	Sony Pictures	
2022	Joey King	The Princess	The Princess	20th Century Studios	
2023	Rebecca Ferguson	Ilsa Faust	Mission: Impossible – Dead Reckoning	Paramount Pictures	
2023	Hayley Atwell	Grace	Mission: Impossible – Dead Reckoning	Paramount Pictures	
2023	Priya Kansara	Ria Khan	Polite Society	Universal Pictures	
2023	Pom Klementieff	Paris	Mission: Impossible – Dead Reckoning	Paramount Pictures	
2023	Rina Sawayama	Shimazu Akira	John Wick: Chapter 4	Lionsgate	
