= The Hunger Games (novel) =

2008 dystopian novel by Suzanne Collins

- North American first edition cover
- Author: Suzanne Collins
- Cover artist: Tim O'Brien
- Language: English
- Series: The Hunger Games trilogy
- Genre: Adventure; Science fiction
- Published: September 14, 2008 (Scholastic Press)
- Publication place: United States
- Media type: Print (hardcover, paperback)
- Pages: 374
- ISBN: 978-0-439-02352-8
- OCLC: 181516677
- LC Class: PZ7.C6837 Hun 2008
- Preceded by: Sunrise on the Reaping
- Followed by: Catching Fire

The Hunger Games is a 2008 dystopian young adult novel by the American writer Suzanne Collins. It is written in the perspective of 16-year-old Katniss Everdeen, who lives in the future, post-apocalyptic nation of Panem in North America. After her sister Primrose is chosen, Katniss takes her place in The Hunger Games, an annual event in which one boy and one girl aged 12–18 from each of the twelve districts surrounding the Capitol compete in a televised battle royale to the death.

The book received critical acclaim from major reviewers and authors. It was praised for its plot and character development. In writing The Hunger Games, Collins drew upon Greek mythology, Roman gladiatorial games, and contemporary reality television for thematic content. The novel won many awards, including the California Young Reader Medal, and was named one of Publishers Weekly's "Best Books of the Year" in 2008.

The Hunger Games was first published in hardcover on September 14, 2008, by Scholastic, featuring a cover designed by Tim O'Brien. It has since been released in paperback and also as an audiobook and ebook. After an initial print of 200,000, the book had sold 800,000 copies by February 2010. Since its release, The Hunger Games has been translated into 26 languages, and publishing rights have been sold in 38 territories. The novel is the first in The Hunger Games trilogy, followed by Catching Fire (2009) and Mockingjay (2010). A film adaptation, directed by Gary Ross and co-written and co-produced by Collins herself, was released in 2012.

== Background ==
Collins has said that the inspiration for The Hunger Games came from channel surfing on television. On one channel she observed people competing on a reality show and on another she saw footage of the invasion of Iraq. The two "began to blur in this very unsettling way" and the idea for the book was formed. The Greek myth of Theseus served as a major basis for the story, with Collins describing Katniss as a futuristic Theseus, and Roman gladiatorial games provided the framework. The sense of loss that Collins developed through her father's service in the Vietnam War was also an influence on the story, with Katniss having lost her father at age 11, five years before the story begins. Collins stated that the deaths of young characters and other "dark passages" were the most difficult parts of the book to write, but that she had accepted that passages such as these were necessary to the story. She considered the moments where Katniss reflects on happier moments in her past to be more enjoyable.

== Plot ==
In the nation of Panem, established in the remains of North America after an apocalyptic event, the wealthy Capitol exploits the twelve surrounding districts for their natural resources and labor. As punishment for a past failed rebellion against the Capitol, which resulted in the obliteration of District 13, one boy and one girl between the ages of 12 and 18 from each of the remaining districts are selected by an annual lottery to participate in the Hunger Games, a contest in which the "tributes" must fight to the death in an outdoor arena until only one remains.

16-year-old Katniss Everdeen from District 12, a coal-rich region, volunteers for the 74th Hunger Games in place of her 12-year-old sister, Primrose. The male tribute is Peeta Mellark, a former schoolmate of Katniss who once gave her bread from his family's bakery when her family was starving. In the days leading up to the Games in the Capitol, they are advised by their drunken mentor, Haymitch Abernathy, the sole living District 12 victor of the Games; chaperone Effie Trinket; and various stylists to enhance their public perception to get potential sponsors, who are allowed to later send potentially life-saving gifts into the arena. Katniss's stylist, Cinna, designs pyrotechnic costumes for Katniss and Peeta that help them stand out, earning Katniss the moniker "The Girl on Fire". During their evaluation by the Gamemakers, Katniss gets the highest score among the tributes. Meanwhile, Rue, a petite 12-year-old girl tribute from District 11, follows Katniss and Peeta around during the training sessions. On the day before the games, in a televised interview, Peeta reveals his long-unrequited love for Katniss. Shocked, Katniss believes this is a ploy to gain sponsors, but later accepts this as sincere. Haymitch promotes their image as "star-crossed lovers".

The Games begin, and nearly half the tributes are killed at the start whilst fighting over weapons and supplies in an area in the center of the arena known as the Cornucopia. Katniss disregards Haymitch's earlier advice to flee immediately and nearly dies but uses her well-practiced hunting and survival skills to hide in the woods. Days later, an artificial fire created by the Gamemakers drives Katniss toward the others. She is spotted and chased up a tree by the "Careers" - tributes who are trained from childhood to compete in the Games and hailing from the wealthiest Districts, with District 2's male tribute Cato leading them; Peeta is also shown to have allied with them. Rue, hiding in a nearby tree, alerts Katniss to a nest of enhanced wasps called "tracker jackers". Katniss cuts it down, releasing the flying insects, which are genetically modified to track whoever disturbs their nest and have venom that targets the section of their victims’ minds that houses fear. Their venom kills two of the Careers and drives the others away, allowing Katniss to claim a bow and arrows off one of the corpses. Peeta returns, but instead of killing her, tells her to run away. Katniss subsequently allies with Rue, and they work together to destroy the Careers' supplies. Rue is then fatally wounded by a Career. Katniss murders Rue's killer and accompanies Rue as she dies. She spreads flowers over Rue's body to show her defiance against the Capitol. In gratitude, District 11 sends Katniss a loaf of bread.

A rule change is announced, allowing the tributes from the same district to win as a pair. Katniss finds Peeta (who only allied with the Careers to protect her) camouflaged into a riverbank, having been wounded by Cato for the tracker jacker incident. She nurses Peeta back to health as best she can and pretends to be madly in love with him in an attempt to gain gifts from sponsors. When the Gamemakers send a delivery of what each contestant needs most, Katniss risks her life to obtain medicine for Peeta. She is intercepted by Career Tribute Clove, who gloats over Rue's death and tries to kill Katniss, but is killed by Thresh, the male District 11 tribute, who spares Katniss for Rue's sake. The medicine saves Peeta's life.

Thresh is later killed by Cato and another tribute dies after consuming toxic "nightlock" berries. With Katniss, Peeta, and Cato the sole survivors, genetically modified wolves are then released into the arena for a finale sequence, chasing them all to the Cornucopia. In the ensuing brawl, Cato is forced off the Cornucopia and brutally mauled by the wolves, with Katniss putting him out of his misery afterwards. Once Katniss and Peeta become the last two survivors, the Gamemakers revoke the rule change to force one to kill the other for a dramatic finale. In defiance, Katniss prepares to consume nightlock with Peeta. Realizing that they intend to commit suicide so that there will not be a victor for the Games, the Gamemakers declare Katniss and Peeta joint victors. Although both of them receive a hero's welcome as a couple, Katniss is warned by Haymitch that the Capitol may take action against her for her defiance. Along the way back to District 12, Peeta is heartbroken to learn that Katniss's actions were part of a calculated ploy to gain sympathy. Katniss, however, is unsure of her own feelings and her future.

== Themes ==
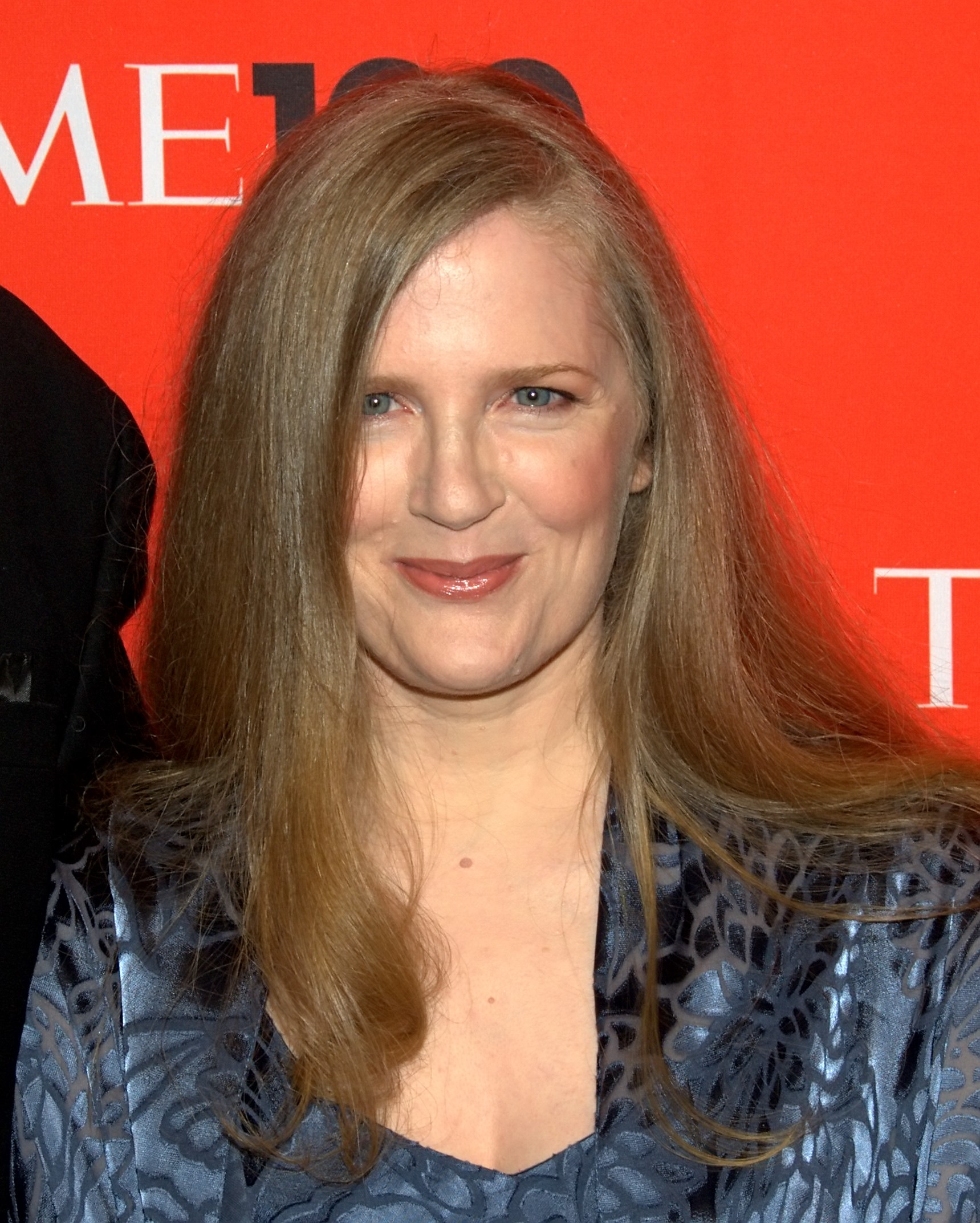
The Hunger Games author Suzanne Collins in 2010

In an interview with Collins, it was noted that the novel "tackles issues like severe poverty, starvation, oppression, and the effects of war among others." The novel deals with the struggle for self-preservation that the people of Panem face in their districts and the Hunger Games in which they must participate. The citizens' starvation and their need for resources, both in and outside of the arena, create an atmosphere of helplessness that the main characters try to overcome in their fight for survival. Katniss needs to hunt to provide food for her family, resulting in the development of skills that are useful to her in the Games (such as her proficiency with the bow and arrow), and represents her rejection of the Capitol's rules in the face of life-threatening situations. On the subject of the Games' parallels with popular culture, Darren Franich of Entertainment Weekly writes that the book "is an incisive satire of reality television shows", and that the character of Cinna "almost seems like a contestant on a fascist version of Project Runway, using Katniss' outfits as a vehicle to express potentially dangerous ideas."

The choices the characters make and the strategies they use are often morally complex. The tributes build a personality they want the audience to see throughout the Games. Library journal Voice of Youth Advocates names the major themes of The Hunger Games as "government control, 'big brother', and personal independence." The trilogy's theme of power and downfall, similar to that of Shakespeare's Julius Caesar, was pointed out by its publisher Scholastic. Laura Miller of The New Yorker finds the author's stated premise of the Games –an exercise in propaganda and a "humiliating as well as torturous [...] punishment" for a failed uprising against the Capitol many years earlier– to be unconvincing. "You don't demoralize and dehumanize a subject people by turning them into celebrities and coaching them on how to craft an appealing persona for a mass audience." But the story works much better if the theme is vicissitudes of high school and "the adolescent social experience". Miller writes:

"The rules are arbitrary, unfathomable, and subject to sudden change. A brutal social hierarchy prevails, with the rich, the good-looking, and the athletic lording their advantages over everyone else. To survive you have to be totally fake. Adults don't seem to understand how high the stakes are; your whole life could be over, and they act like it's just some "phase"! Everyone's always watching you, scrutinizing your clothes or your friends and obsessing over whether you're having sex or taking drugs or getting good enough grades, but no one cares who you really are or how you really feel about anything."

Donald Brake from The Washington Times and pastor Andy Langford state that the story has Christian themes, such as that of self-sacrifice, which is found in Katniss' substitution for her younger sister, analogous to the sacrifice of Jesus as a substitute for the atonement of sins. Brake, as well as another reviewer, Amy Simpson, both find that the story also revolves around the theme of hope, which is exemplified in the "incorruptible goodness of Katniss' sister, Primrose." Simpson also points to events similar to the Passion of Jesus; in the Games, "Christ figure" Peeta Mellark is stabbed after warning Katniss to flee for her life, and is then buried in the ground and placed in a cave for three days before emerging with a new lease on life. Further, she finds that the Christian image of the Bread of Life is used throughout The Hunger Games; in the story, Peeta gives Katniss a loaf of bread, saving the girl and her family from starvation.

== Publication history ==
After writing the novel, Collins signed a six-figure deal for three books with Scholastic. First published as a hardcover in the United States on September 14, 2008, The Hunger Games had a first printing of 50,000 copies, which was bumped up twice to 200,000 copies. By February 2010, the book had sold 800,000 copies, and rights to the novel had been sold in 38 territories worldwide. A few months later, in July, the book was released in paperback. The Hunger Games entered the New York Times Best Seller list in November 2008, where it would feature for over 100 consecutive weeks. By the time the film adaptation of The Hunger Games was released in March 2012, the book had been on USA Today's best-sellers list for 135 consecutive weeks and has sold over 17.5 million copies.

The novel is the first in The Hunger Games trilogy; it is followed by sequels Catching Fire (2009) and Mockingjay (2010). In March 2012, during the time of The Hunger Games film's release, Scholastic reported 26 million Hunger Games trilogy books in print, including movie tie-in books. The Hunger Games (and its sequels) have sold exceptionally well in ebook format. Suzanne Collins is the first children's or young adult author to sell over one million Amazon Kindle ebooks, making her the sixth author to join the "Kindle Million Club". In March 2012, Amazon announced that Collins had become the best-selling Kindle ebook author of all time.

An audiobook version of The Hunger Games was released in December 2008. Read by the actress Carolyn McCormick, it has a total running time of eleven hours and fourteen minutes. The magazine AudioFile said: "Carolyn McCormick gives a detailed and attentive narration. However, she may rely too much on the strength of the prose without providing the drama young adult listeners often enjoy." School Library Journal also praised the audiobook, stating that "McCormick ably voices the action-packed sequences and Katniss's every fear and strength shines through, along with her doomed growing attraction to one of her fellow Tributes."

The Tim O'Brien-designed cover features a gold "mockingjay" – a fictional bird in The Hunger Games born by crossbreeding female mockingbirds and genetically engineered male "jabberjays" – with an arrow engraved in a circle. This is a depiction of the pin worn by Katniss into the arena, given to her by the District 12 mayor's daughter, Madge Undersee. The image matches the description of the pin that is given in the novel, except for the arrow: "It's as if someone fashioned a small golden bird and then attached a ring around it. The bird is connected to the ring only by its wing tips."

== Critical reception ==
In a review for The New York Times, John Green wrote that the novel was "brilliantly plotted and perfectly paced", and that "the considerable strength of the novel comes in Collins's convincingly detailed world-building and her memorably complex and fascinating heroine." However, he also noted that, while allegorically rich, the book sometimes does not realize the allegorical potential that the plot has to offer and that the writing "described the action and little else." Time magazine's review was also positive, stating that it "is a chilling, bloody and thoroughly horrifying book" and praising what it called the "hypnotic" quality of the violence. In Stephen King's review for Entertainment Weekly, he compared it to "shoot-it-if-it-moves videogames in the lobby of the local eightplex; you know it's not real, but you keep plugging in quarters anyway." However, he stated that there were "displays of authorial laziness that kids will accept more readily than adults" and that the love triangle was standard for the genre. He gave the book a B grade. Elizabeth Bird of School Library Journal praised the novel, saying it is "exciting, poignant, thoughtful, and breathtaking by turns", and called it one of the best books of 2008. Booklist also gave a positive review, praising the character violence and romance involved in the book. Kirkus Reviews gave a positive review, praising the action and world-building, but pointed out that "poor copyediting in the first printing will distract careful readers–a crying shame". Rick Riordan, author of the Percy Jackson & the Olympians series, claims it is the "closest thing to a perfect adventure novel" he has ever read. Stephenie Meyer (author of the Twilight series) endorsed the book on her website, saying, "I was so obsessed with this book ... The Hunger Games is amazing."

The Hunger Games received many awards and honors. It was named one of Publishers Weekly's "Best Books of the Year" in 2008 and a New York Times "Notable Children's Book of 2008". It was the 2009 winner of the Golden Duck Award in the Young Adult Fiction Category. The Hunger Games was also a "2008 Cybil Winner" for fantasy and science-fiction books along with The Graveyard Book, one of School Library Journal's "Best Books 2008", and a "Booklist Editors' Choice" in 2008. In 2011, the book won the California Young Reader Medal. In the 2012 edition of Scholastic's Parent and Child magazine, The Hunger Games was listed as the 33rd-best book for children, with the award for "Most Exciting Ending". The novel is one of the top 5 best selling Kindle books of all time. However, the novel has also been controversial with parents; it ranked in fifth place on the American Library Association's list of frequently challenged books for 2010, with "unsuited to age group" and "violence" being among the reasons cited.

Similarities of The Hunger Games to Koushun Takami's 1999 novel Battle Royale have been noted. Collins stated that she "had never heard of that book or that author until my book was turned in. At that point, it was mentioned to me, and I asked my editor if I should read it. He said: 'No, I don't want that world in your head. Just continue with what you're doing'." Susan Dominus of The New York Times reports that "the parallels are striking enough that Collins's work has been savaged on the blogosphere as a baldfaced ripoff" of Battle Royale but argued that "there are enough possible sources for the plot line that the two authors might well have hit on the same basic setup independently." Stephen King noted that the reality TV "badlands" were similar to Battle Royale, as well as his own novels The Running Man and The Long Walk. The story has also been compared to the 1965 Italian cult film The 10th Victim by Elio Petri, based on Robert Sheckley's 1953 short story "Seventh Victim".

== Film adaptation ==
In March 2009, Lions Gate Entertainment entered into a co-production agreement for The Hunger Games with Nina Jacobson's production company Color Force, which had acquired worldwide distribution rights to the novel a few weeks earlier. The studio, which had not made a profit for five years, raided the budgets of other productions and sold assets to secure a budget of $88,000,000 – one of its largest ever – for the film. Collins' agent Jason Dravis remarked that "they [Lionsgate] had everyone but the valet call us" to help secure the franchise. Intending the film to have a PG-13 rating, Collins adapted the novel for film herself, in collaboration with screenwriter Billy Ray and director Gary Ross. The screenplay remains extremely faithful to the original novel, with Ross saying he "felt the only way to make the film really successful was to be totally subjective" in its presentation of events, echoing Collins' use of first person present in the novel.

Twenty-year-old actress Jennifer Lawrence was chosen to play Katniss Everdeen. Josh Hutcherson and Liam Hemsworth were later added to the cast, in the roles of Peeta and Gale, respectively. Production began in late spring 2011 and the film was released on March 23, 2012. The film's opening weekend brought in a non-sequel record $152.5 million (USD) in North America. The Hunger Games: Catching Fire, based on the second novel in the series, was released the following year on November 22, 2013. The third novel of the series, Mockingjay, would later be adapted to film as two parts, with Part 1 being released on November 21, 2014, and Part 2 being released on November 20, 2015.

== See also ==
- The Condemned
- Crypteia
- The Most Dangerous Game
- Series 7: The Contenders
- "The Lottery"
