= The Hunger Games: Mockingjay – Part 2 =

2015 film by Francis Lawrence

- Theatrical release poster
- Directed by: Francis Lawrence
- Screenplay by: Peter Craig; Danny Strong
- Adaptation by: Suzanne Collins
- Based on: Mockingjay by Suzanne Collins
- Produced by: Nina Jacobson; Jon Kilik
- Starring: Jennifer Lawrence; Josh Hutcherson; Liam Hemsworth; Woody Harrelson; Elizabeth Banks; Julianne Moore; Philip Seymour Hoffman; Jeffrey Wright; Stanley Tucci; Donald Sutherland
- Cinematography: Jo Willems
- Edited by: Alan Edward Bell; Mark Yoshikawa
- Music by: James Newton Howard
- Production companies: Lionsgate Films; Color Force
- Distributed by: Lionsgate
- Release dates: November 4, 2015 (Sony Center); November 20, 2015 (United States)
- Running time: 137 minutes
- Country: United States
- Language: English
- Budget: $160 million
- Box office: $684.5 million

The Hunger Games: Mockingjay – Part 2 is a 2015 American dystopian film directed by Francis Lawrence from a screenplay by Peter Craig and Danny Strong. It is the second of two cinematic parts based on the 2010 novel Mockingjay by Suzanne Collins, and the fourth and final installment of the original Hunger Games film series. The film stars Jennifer Lawrence, Josh Hutcherson, Liam Hemsworth, Woody Harrelson, Elizabeth Banks, Julianne Moore, Jeffrey Wright, Stanley Tucci, Donald Sutherland, and Philip Seymour Hoffman, in his final film role. In the film, Katniss Everdeen (Lawrence) leads a team of rebels into the very heart of the Capitol to liberate it and all of Panem from the tyrannical leadership of Coriolanus Snow (Sutherland).

Together with its predecessor, principal photography began in September 2013 and lasted until June 2014, taking place back-to-back, with filming locations including Boston, Atlanta, Paris, Berlin, and Los Angeles. Hoffman, who died in February 2014, completed the majority of his scenes, although his death caused other scenes to be rewritten.

The Hunger Games: Mockingjay – Part 2 premiered at the Sony Center in Berlin on November 4, 2015, and was released in the United States on November 20, by Lionsgate, in 2D, 3D, and IMAX. The film received generally positive reviews from critics, with praise for its performances (particularly Lawrence, Hutcherson and Sutherland's), screenplay, music, and action sequences. It was deemed a fitting end to the series, although some were divided on the decision to split the novel into two films. It grossed $684.5 million, making it the ninth-highest-grossing film of 2015.

Among its accolades, the film was nominated for Best Fantasy Film at the 42nd Saturn Awards. It received three nominations at the 21st Empire Awards for Best Sci-Fi/Fantasy, Best Actress (Lawrence) and Best Production Design, while Lawrence was nominated for Best Actress in an Action Movie at the 21st Critics' Choice Awards. A prequel series began with The Hunger Games: The Ballad of Songbirds & Snakes, which was released in November 2023.

== Plot ==
After being attacked by a brainwashed Peeta Mellark, (Note: As depicted in The Hunger Games: Mockingjay – Part 1 (2014)) Katniss Everdeen recovers from her injuries in District 13. The President of District 13, Alma Coin, refuses to let Katniss go to the Capitol until they secure District 2, the last district under Capitol control. Katniss is sent to join the assault on the Capitol's armory in District 2, hoping to rally the rebels in that district to join their cause. During her speech, Katniss is shot but survives because the costume made by Cinna is bulletproof. Despite the sudden attack, the Capitol’s tyrannical President Coriolanus Snow deduces that she is still alive due to the rebels not branding her a martyr. After they secure District 2, Finnick and Annie get married.

Katniss is recruited into the Star Squad, a special group that includes Gale and Finnick. They are given orders to stay away from the front lines and given suicide pills if captured. Though still not fully recovered, Peeta joins the team to appear in propaganda videos. Under Boggs' command, the squad reaches the Capitol, avoiding deadly "pods" or booby traps planted by the Capitol's Game Makers using Boggs' holographic map. However, Boggs is mortally wounded by one of the pods and entrusts the map to Katniss while warning her about President Coin's ulterior motives and to therefore not trust anyone.

A team member accidentally triggers a pod that seals their area and releases acidic, black tar-like liquid. During their escape, Peeta relapses, attacks Katniss, and kills a squad member attempting to stop him by pushing them into the tar, before the others subdue him and hide in a building. Peacekeepers corner them, but the Leeg sisters stay behind to hold them off while the rest escape, leading to the building's destruction and their deaths. The Capitol announces Katniss's death, and Snow begins a speech but is interrupted by a cyberattack from District 13, allowing Coin to deliver a eulogy to inspire the rebels.

Katniss leads them through the sewers beneath the Capitol, but Snow, alerted by their survival, deploys genetically engineered reptilian "mutts" to attack them. Finnick and several others are killed, before Katniss uses the map to trigger an explosion, destroying the mutts. The survivors take refuge in a house owned by Tigris, a former stylist for the Hunger Games.

As Snow invites Capitol citizens into his mansion under the guise of evacuating to form a human shield, Katniss and Gale join the crowd in disguise, intending to infiltrate the mansion. The rebels arrive in the Capitol and engage the Peacekeepers. Gale is eventually taken away by the Peacekeepers. The Capitol children are separated and brought closer to the mansion, but a Capitol ship drops bombs on them. Medics rush onto the scene, including Katniss's sister Prim, but are killed by a second bombing, and Katniss is knocked unconscious.

Katniss wakes up, and Haymitch informs her that the rebels have won the war. She confronts Snow, who reveals that Coin staged the bombing to turn his followers against him. Despite believing him, Katniss goes into denial until Snow reminds her that they agreed never to lie to each other.

Coin, now the interim President, refuses to hold the promised democratic election and suggests a final, symbolic Hunger Games using Capitol leaders' children as revenge. Some tributes, including Peeta, are outraged, while others support the initiative. Katniss agrees to the plan but demands to execute Snow herself. At the execution, while preparing to shoot Snow in front of a mob, Katniss instead shoots Coin, killing her. Snow laughs defiantly before being lynched to death by the mob. Katniss tries to swallow her pill, but Peeta stops her, and she is arrested. Haymitch brings Katniss a letter from Plutarch, assuring her that she will be pardoned, the Hunger Games will cease to exist, and she will be able to return to District 12 now that all of Panem is free.

Katniss returns home, and is later joined by a nearly-recovered Peeta. They receive a letter from Annie about their friends' lives. Years later, Katniss and Peeta are married with two children. When their newborn cries from a nightmare, Katniss comforts her, promising to share their past story.

== Cast ==
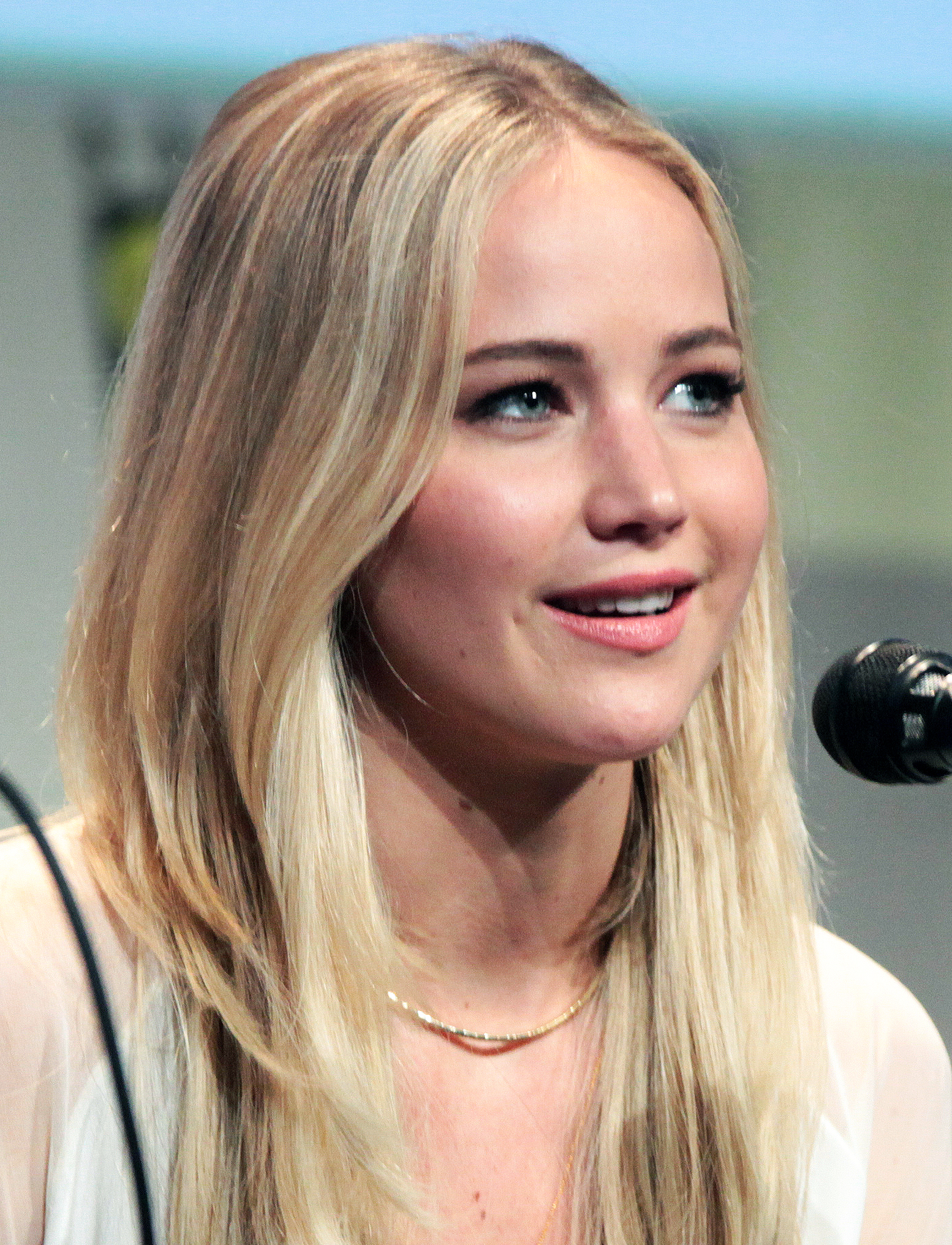
Jennifer Lawrence made her fourth appearance to date as Katniss Everdeen in the film.

- Jennifer Lawrence as Katniss Everdeen
- Josh Hutcherson as Peeta Mellark
- Liam Hemsworth as Gale Hawthorne
- Woody Harrelson as Haymitch Abernathy
- Elizabeth Banks as Effie Trinket
- Julianne Moore as President Alma Coin
- Philip Seymour Hoffman as Plutarch Heavensbee
- Jeffrey Wright as Beetee
- Stanley Tucci as Caesar Flickerman
- Donald Sutherland as President Snow
- Willow Shields as Primrose Everdeen
- Sam Claflin as Finnick Odair
- Jena Malone as Johanna Mason
- Mahershala Ali as Boggs
- Natalie Dormer as Cressida
- Wes Chatham as Castor
- Michelle Forbes as Lieutenant Jackson
- Elden Henson as Pollux
- Patina Miller as Commander Paylor
- Evan Ross as Messalla
- Omid Abtahi as Homes

Stef Dawson returned for her third appearance as Annie Cresta, Meta Golding for her second appearance as Enobaria, Robert Knepper as Antonius, Paula Malcomson for her fourth appearance as Katniss's mother, Eugenie Bondurant as Tigris, Gwendoline Christie as Commander Lyme, a previous victor from District 2. Twins Misty and Kim Ormiston as Leeg 1 and Leeg 2, and Joe Chrest as Mitchell, while Jennifer Lawrence's nephews, Theodore and Bear, appear briefly as Katniss and Peeta's children.

== Production ==
=== Pre-production ===
On July 10, 2012, Lionsgate announced that the film adaptation of Mockingjay would be split into two parts; The Hunger Games: Mockingjay – Part 1, released on November 21, 2014, and The Hunger Games: Mockingjay – Part 2, released November 20, 2015. On November 1, 2012, Francis Lawrence, director of The Hunger Games: Catching Fire, announced that he would return to direct both final films of the series. Talking about direction for the last two parts, Francis explains "I felt a different kind of pressure". "[On 'The Hunger Games: Catching Fire'], I had to prove myself a little bit as the new guy in the game. It was a relief that it was received well by the fans. Even though I was relieved, it was only momentary; it sort of set the bar higher for the next one!"

On December 6, 2012, Danny Strong announced that he would write the third and fourth films. On February 15, 2013, Lionsgate approved the script for Part 1 and gave permission to write that of Part 2. In August, Hemsworth confirmed that shooting of the film would begin during the following month.

Production began on September 16, 2013, in Boston, Atlanta, and Los Angeles. Studio Babelsberg co-produced and oversaw production services for the film. On November 13, 2013, producer Nina Jacobson revealed that Peter Craig was also hired to write the adaptations. The film had a production budget of $160 million, with a further $55 million spent on promotion and advertisements, and $13.9 million on television advertisements.

=== Casting ===
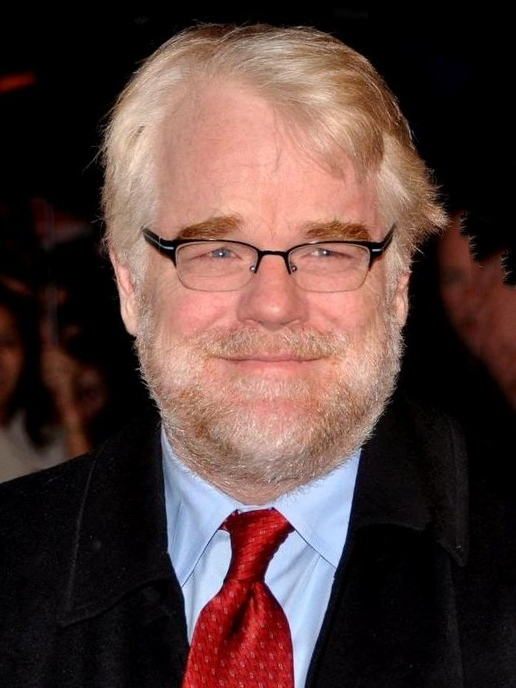
Philip Seymour Hoffman plays Plutarch Heavensbee in his final appearance before his death in 2014.

All the principal cast including Jennifer Lawrence as Katniss, Josh Hutcherson as Peeta, Liam Hemsworth as Gale, Woody Harrelson as Haymitch, Donald Sutherland as President Snow, Elizabeth Banks as Effie, Willow Shields as Prim, Paula Malcomson as Katniss's mother and Stanley Tucci as Caesar, returned to reprise their roles. Julianne Moore also returned as President Alma Coin, along with Philip Seymour Hoffman, who died during filming in February 2014, as Plutarch. He had nearly completed his scenes, and his two remaining scenes were rewritten to adjust for his absence. His death also changed the actors schedule to shorter work days. Regarding Hoffman's scenes, Francis Lawrence commented that, "He had two substantial scenes left and the rest were appearances in other scenes. We had no intention of trying to fake a performance, so we rewrote those scenes to give to other actors… The rest, we just didn't have him appear in those scenes. There's no digital manipulation or CG fabrication of any kind." One of the changed scenes saw Plutarch sending Katniss a letter in prison, read by Haymitch, rather than coming to talk to her after her arrest for assassinating President Coin, explained as his being unable to see her for political reasons after her actions, which he nonetheless supports.

On August 26, 2013, it was announced that actress Stef Dawson had joined the cast to portray Annie Cresta. Lionsgate announced on September 13, 2013, that Julianne Moore joined the cast to play President Alma Coin. The same month, Lily Rabe, Patina Miller, Mahershala Ali, Wes Chatham, and Elden Henson were announced to have joined the cast, to reprise their roles of Commander Lyme, Commander Paylor, Boggs, Castor, and Pollux, respectively. There was also a casting call for extras. Rabe subsequently had to leave the film due to a scheduling conflict with the 2014 Shakespeare in the Park production of Much Ado About Nothing. On April 4, 2014, it was announced that she would be replaced by Gwendoline Christie to portray Lyme. Wyatt Russell was originally offered a role in both parts of Mockingjay, but his father Kurt confirmed in September 2013 that he turned down the offer to star in 22 Jump Street.

=== Filming ===
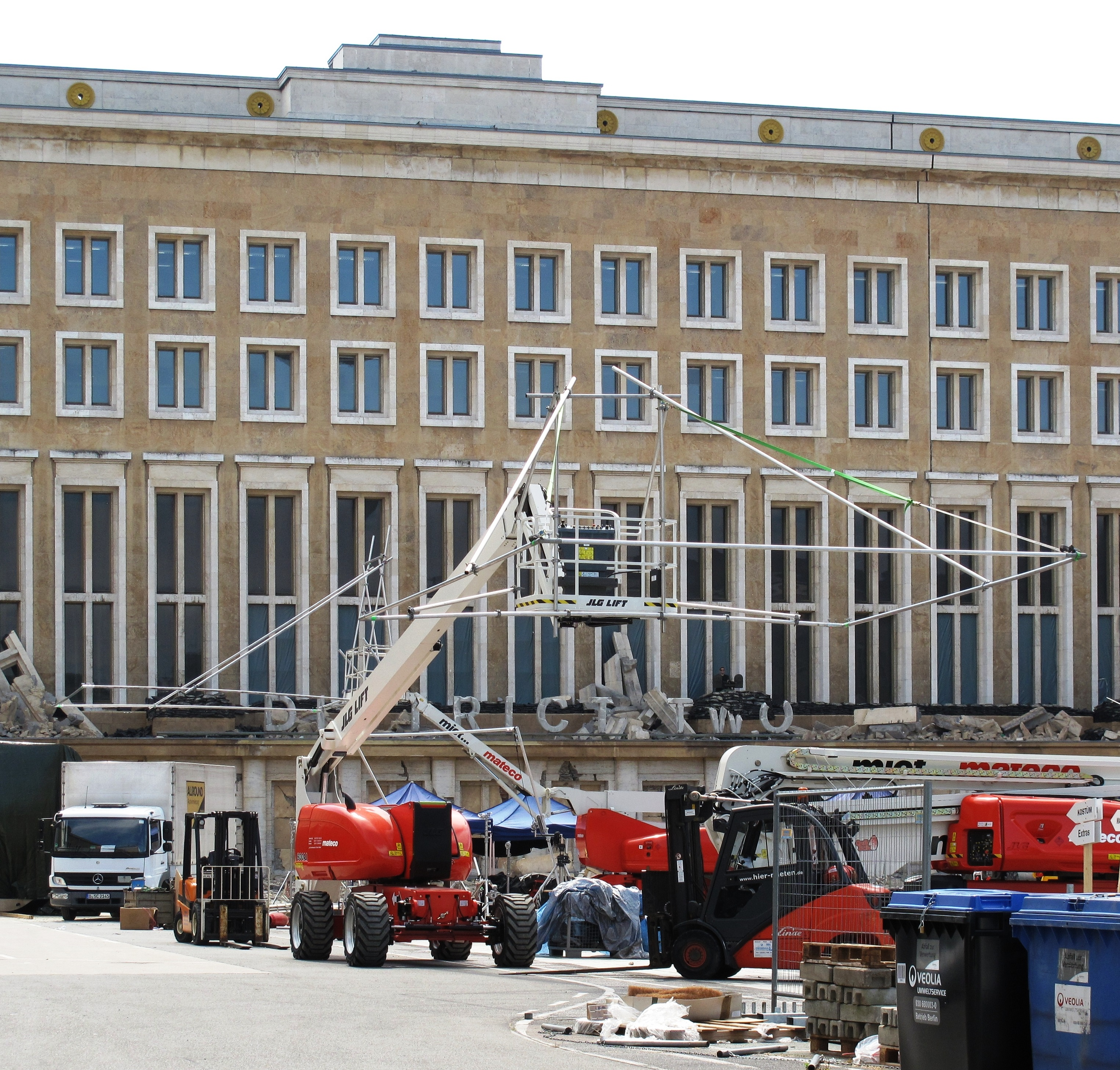
Filming scenes for District 2 at Berlin Tempelhof Airport in May 2014

Principal photography began on September 23, 2013, in Atlanta, and concluded on June 20, 2014, in Berlin, Germany; the two parts were filmed back-to-back. In October 2013, filming took place in Rockmart, Georgia. After the cast and crew took a break to promote The Hunger Games: Catching Fire, filming resumed on December 2, 2013. On December 14, 2013, shooting was held at the Marriott Marquis in Atlanta. On December 18, shooting began at Caldwell Tanks in Newnan, Georgia.

Philip Seymour Hoffman died on February 2, 2014. He had completed his scenes for Part 1 and had a week left of shooting for Part 2; Lionsgate thereafter released a statement affirming that since the majority of Hoffman's scenes had been completed, the release date for Part 2 would not be affected. It was initially announced that Hoffman would be digitally recreated for a major scene involving his character that had not been shot, but Francis Lawrence later stated that he had rewritten Hoffman's two remaining scenes to compensate for the actor's absence. In a scene near the end, which was to have shown Plutarch speaking with Katniss in detention, Woody Harrelson's character instead reads her a letter from him.

Filming in Atlanta completed in mid-April 2014, and production moved to Europe. On May 9, filming took place in Les Espaces d'Abraxas complex in Noisy le Grand, Paris. It is the same location where Brazil (1985) was filmed 30 years earlier. Toward the end of May, the cast and crew shot scenes at several locations in Berlin and Brandenburg, Germany. In Rüdersdorf, Brandenburg, the crew shot scenes for the portrayal of District 8 in an old cement factory. Hemsworth was injured on the set and was brought to a doctor in the Berlin borough Mitte. Scenes for District 2 were shot at Berlin Tempelhof Airport. A German casting agency sought 1,000 ethnically diverse extras (African, Asian, Southern-European, and Turkish) and "lived faces" to shoot scenes at the Babelsberg Film Studio.

== Music ==
The film score was released on November 23, 2015. James Newton Howard returned to compose the film score; unlike the previous films in the series, there is no additional pop companion album with songs inspired by the film. Jennifer Lawrence performed "Deep in the Meadow", a lullaby that she sang in the first film.

== Release ==
=== Marketing ===
Along with the film's first teaser poster, Lionsgate released a teaser trailer on March 18, 2015, titled The Hunger Games Franchise Logo — Remember, featuring the transformation of the Mockingjay, along with notable quotes from the previous three movies, as well as a quote from the new film. The teaser was also played at screenings of Lionsgate's The Divergent Series: Insurgent. Scott Mendelson of Forbes noted the similarity of the teaser with that of The Dark Knight's (2008) teaser, which also features just an animated logo of the film and select dialogue. On June 1, a new teaser poster for the film, featuring a vandalised statue of President Snow, was revealed on the viral site TheCapitol.PN. On June 9, the teaser trailer for the film was released. A series of different posters, featuring the main cast with red Mockingjays painted on their faces, was released in July by Lionsgate.

Later in July 2015, Lionsgate released a motion and teaser poster and propaganda video, followed by the film's official trailer. In August, a poster was released stating "100 days until The Hunger Games: Mockingjay – Part 2". However, it was taken down shortly thereafter, as the text on the poster appeared to resemble a swear word due to layout. However, another "bold and beautiful" poster was released depicting Katniss standing on the shoulder of a fallen President Snow statue.

In October 2015, the first official clip and the final trailer were released, followed by the film's theatrical posters.

In certain parts of Israel, the poster which depicted the image of Katniss (Lawrence) aiming her bow and arrow was removed over concerns her image would offend ultra-Orthodox Jewish audiences. Instead, a fiery mockingjay in the poster's background replaced Lawrence in marketing materials in multiple locations in Israel including Bnei Brak and West Jerusalem. Lionsgate did not comment on the Israeli marketing campaign. In Jerusalem, public posters with the image of a female are often torn down, while Bnei Brak does not allow posters with female images.

=== Theatrical ===
The Hunger Games: Mockingjay – Part 2 premiered in Los Angeles, at the L.A. Live, complex on November 16, and in New York City on November 18. It premiered internationally in Berlin on November 4, in London November 5, in Paris November 9, in Madrid November 10, and in Beijing November 12. Due to the terrorist attacks in Paris on November 13, Lionsgate scaled down its L.A. premiere, cancelling press interviews on the red carpet (which was scheduled to last two hours). The stars mostly greeted fans and took a few photos before heading into the screening in Downtown Los Angeles. Mockingjay – Part 2 was released on November 20, 2015, in the United States and Canada. The film was originally scheduled to be released in 2D, Digital 3D, RealD 3D, and IMAX 3D, which would have made it the only film of the series to be globally released in 3D formats; the previous film was released in 3D in China. It is the third film in the franchise to be released in IMAX, following the first and the second film with the exception of the third film. However, the decision to release the film in 3D and IMAX 3D in North America was revoked. Director Francis Lawrence discussed the decision, stating, "I love the 3D format and I know that Mockingjay Part 2 will play perfectly in 3D and 2D internationally – but I'm pleased that we're maintaining the 2D only (and IMAX) formats domestically. It is the best of all worlds!". It was nevertheless released in 3D formats in overseas markets, including China. The film was also released in the Dolby Vision format in Dolby Cinemas, which is the first ever for Lionsgate.

Internationally, it was released day-and-date across 87 countries, starting from November 18, in certain markets like Belgium, Brazil, France and the Netherlands and on November 19 in Australia, Germany, Russia, Italy, and the United Kingdom, followed by China, Mexico, Japan, the United States, Canada, and 19 other markets, on November 20, as part of the biggest movie rollout ever by Lionsgate. The only big territories where the film did not open on the same weekend are Spain, Greece and India, which released the movie on November 27.

=== Home media ===
The Hunger Games: Mockingjay – Part 2 was released on Digital HD on March 8, 2016, and was followed by a Blu-ray and DVD release on March 22, 2016. It topped the home video sales chart for the week ending on March 27, 2016. The film made a revenue of $49.1 million from home media sales with 2.9 million units sold, making it the ninth best-selling title of 2016. The entire Hunger Games original series was released on 4K UHD Blu-Ray on November 8, 2016.

== Reception ==
=== Box office ===
The Hunger Games: Mockingjay – Part 2 fell short of expectations at the box office. It grossed a total of $282 million in the United States and Canada, and $402.5 million in other countries, for a worldwide total of $684.5 million. Its worldwide opening of $247.2 million is the 27th-highest of all time. It is the second lowest-grossing film in The Hunger Games film series, following the release of the prequel The Hunger Games: The Ballad of Songbirds and Snakes, and the ninth-highest-grossing film of 2015, Lionsgate's co-chairman Rob Friedman blamed the impact of the November 2015 Paris attacks as well as Star Wars: Episode VII – The Force Awakens for the film's underwhelming performance in certain European countries and in the U.S. and Canada, further blaming the latter for cutting the film's North American gross by as much as $50–100 million. Deadline Hollywood, noted that Mockingjay – Part 2 had the lowest opening among the series and was already grossing behind Mockingjay – Part 1 by $32.7 million or 12% before The Force Awakens even opened. Deadline also stated that the attacks in Paris did not noticeably affect the European release of Mockingjay – Part 2. In China, the film notably grossed a disappointing $21.5 million, which the studio blamed on the competition with The Martian and Spectre, along with the Taiwanese film Our Times. Deadline Hollywood calculated the net profit of the film to be $134.3 million, when factoring together all expenses and revenues for the film.

==== North America ====
In North America, according to pre-release trackings, The Hunger Games: Mockingjay – Part 2 was initially projected to earn around $120–125 million in its opening weekend. However, estimates decreased to a mid-$110 million range once the film approached its opening day. It made $16 million from its Thursday night preview which is the lowest among the franchise but the third-highest of 2015, and $45.5 million on its opening day. In its opening weekend, the film grossed $102.7 million, finishing first at the box office but falling below expectations and becoming the lowest opening among the franchise. Sources attributed the franchise-low opening to heavy winter weather hitting areas such as South Dakota, Michigan, and Chicago as well as Lionsgate's decision to split the last novel into two separate pictures. Still, it is the fourth film in the Hunger Games film series to open with more than $100 million, and 2015's sixth-highest opening, behind Star Wars: The Force Awakens, Jurassic World, Avengers: Age of Ultron, Furious 7, and Minions. IMAX comprised $8.5 million of the opening gross from 384 IMAX locations. The below-expectations opening of the film led to the decline of Lionsgate stock the day after its opening weekend. The film retained the top spot at the box office in the second weekend, declining 49.3% and grossing $52 million. It topped the box office for the third consecutive weekend despite facing competition with the animated movie The Good Dinosaur and the horror comedy Krampus in its second and third weekend, respectively. In total, it held the No. 1 spot in the North American box office for four consecutive weekends (even after facing competition with In the Heart of the Sea in its fourth weekend), becoming the first film since Furious 7 to top the box office for four straight weekends and the second film in The Hunger Games film series after 2012's The Hunger Games to achieve this feat. Mockingjay – Part 2 grossed a total of $281 million, 17% less than Mockingjay – Part 1 and is also the lowest when compared with the two other films in the series.

==== Outside North America ====
Outside North America, the film was released in a total of 92 countries. It was projected by many box office analysts to surpass the openings of all the previous Hunger Games films, considering it was the last installment, and that its release date was the same in 87 markets, including China (the latter being a rare phenomenon). It was projected to gross around $165–185 million. However, it ended up earning $144.5 million across 32,500 screens from 87 markets opening at No. 1 in 81 of them. The underperformance was attributed to the 2015 Paris terror attacks, which affected many parts of Europe, and the rising value of the U.S. dollar. Earning $62 million (down 57%) and $30.05 million (down 49%) in its second and third weekend, respectively, it topped the international box office for four consecutive weekends.

The United Kingdom posted the highest opening with $17.1 million followed by China with $15.8 million, Germany ($15 million), Mexico ($8.9 million) France ($7.1 million), Australia ($6.8 million), Brazil ($6.8 million), Russia ($6.7 million), Venezuela ($5.6 million), and Italy ($4.3 million). In China, it opened at No. 1 despite facing competition with Taiwanese film Our Times, and the continued run of Spectre and having an underperforming opening. It fell precipitously by 88.6% in its second weekend, which is the worst second-weekend drop for any major Hollywood release in China of 2015. Notably in France, the opening was above expectations considering cinemagoers being affected by the Paris terror attacks and the heightened state of alert in Belgium at that time. It topped the United Kingdom and Ireland box office for four consecutive weekends which is a rare achievement and thereby becoming the first film since Les Misérables in 2013 to have four straight weeks of win at the UK box office. It was the highest-grossing film of 2015 in Colombia with $36 million. In terms of total earnings its largest markets are Germany ($43.7 million) and the United Kingdom ($43.1 million), and Colombia ($36 million).

=== Critical response ===
The Hunger Games: Mockingjay – Part 2 received generally positive reviews from critics, with praise for action sequences and performances but criticism for splitting the book into two separate adaptations. On review aggregation website Rotten Tomatoes, the film has an approval rating of 70%, based on 294 reviews, with an average rating of 6.5/10. The website's critical consensus reads, "With the unflinchingly grim Mockingjay Part 2, The Hunger Games comes to an exciting, poignant, and overall satisfying conclusion." On Metacritic, the film has a weighted average score of 65 out of 100, based on 45 critics, indicating "generally favorable reviews". Audiences polled by CinemaScore gave the film an average grade of "A−" on an A+ to F scale.

Lawrence, Hutcherson, and Sutherland received praise for their performances. The supporting cast's performances, particularly Harrelson, Claflin, and Malone's, were also highly praised, but critics felt their appearances were too brief. Several critics also commented on the film's dark tone, even by comparison to its predecessors. Manohla Dargis from The New York Times praised Lawrence's character saying, "Katniss is the right heroine for these neo-feminist times."

Stephen Whitty from New York Daily News said, "'Remember that line from the first 'Hunger Games' film: "May the odds be ever in your favor"? Yeah, well, that luck has run out'."

Leah Greenblatt of Entertainment Weekly remarked, "With its political power struggles and prodigious body count, all rendered in a thousand shades of wintry greige, the movie feels less like teen entertainment than a sort of Hunger Games of Thrones." Robbie Collin awarded the film four out of five stars and called the film "scorchingly tense". In his review for The Telegraph, he praised the film for "being intense" and lauded the performances of Lawrence and Hoffman."

Benjamin Lee, writing for The Guardian, felt that "the decision to split the final chapter of the dystopian saga into two chapters looms large over a frustratingly-paced mixture of thrilling action and surprisingly dark drama." He praised Jennifer Lawrence's acting and Francis Lawrence's direction and commented, "The decision to turn a 390-page book into over four hours' worth of screen time (and a bonus payday) has resulted in a patchy end to a franchise that started so promisingly." Tom Huddleston of Time Out gave the film four out of five stars. He praised the ending of the film as "genuinely powerful", and commented that "this might be the most downbeat blockbuster in memory, a film that starts out pitiless and goes downhill from there, save for a fleeting glimmer of hope in the final moments. It's a bold statement about the unforgiving nature of war, unashamedly political in its motives and quietly devastating in its emotional effect."

=== Retrospective ===
In a 2023 interview with People, director Francis Lawrence admitted his regrets splitting Mockingjay into two films. He said "What I realized in retrospect — and after hearing all the reactions and feeling the kind of wrath of fans, critics and people at the split — is that I realized it was frustrating. And I can understand it. In an episode of television, if you have a cliffhanger, you have to wait a week or you could just binge it and then you can see the next episode. But making people wait a year, I think, came across as disingenuous, even though it wasn't. Our intentions were not to be disingenuous. In truth, we got more on the screen out of the book than we would've in any of the other movies because you're getting close to four hours of screen time for the final book. But, I see and understand how it frustrated people". Because of these reasons, Lawrence desisted from likewise splitting The Ballad of Songbirds & Snakes into two films, despite briefly considering the possibility due to the novel's length.

== Accolades ==
Award	Category	Recipient(s)	Result
Alliance of Women Film Journalists	Best Female Action Star	Jennifer Lawrence	Nominated
CLIO Key Art Awards	Theatrical: Audio/Visual Creative Content – Short Form		Silver
CLIO Key Art Awards	Theatrical: Audio/Visual Technique Motion Graphics		Won
CLIO Key Art Awards	Theatrical: Print Domestic One-Sheet		Silver
CLIO Key Art Awards	Theatrical: Print Motion Poster	Bird Logo Motion Poster	Silver
CLIO Key Art Awards	Theatrical: Print Motion Poster	The Revolution is About All of Us	Bronze
Costume Designers Guild Awards	Excellence in Fantasy Film	Kurt and Bart	Nominated
Critics' Choice Awards	Best Actress in an Action Movie	Jennifer Lawrence	Nominated
Empire Awards	Best Actress	Jennifer Lawrence	Nominated
Empire Awards	Best Sci-Fi Fantasy		Nominated
Empire Awards	Best Production Design		Nominated
Fan Choice Awards	Best Book-Adapted Movie		Won
Fan Choice Awards	Best Female Character	Katniss Everdeen	Nominated
Fan Choice Awards	Best Couple in a Movie	Katniss Everdeen and Peeta Mellark	Won
Fan Choice Awards	Best Sci-Fi/Fantasy Movie		Won
Fan Choice Awards	Best Action Sequence	Squad 451 vs. Lizard Mutts	Won
Georgia Film Critics Association	Oglethorpe Award	Francis Lawrence, Peter Craig and Danny Strong	Nominated
Golden Trailer Awards	Best Fantasy Adventure Trailer		Nominated
Golden Trailer Awards	Best Motion/Title Graphics		Nominated
Golden Trailer Awards	Best Fantasy Adventure TV Spot		Won
Golden Trailer Awards	Best Music TV Spot		Nominated
Golden Trailer Awards	Best Action Poster & Best Fantasy/Adventure Poster		Won
Golden Trailer Awards	Best Billboard		Nominated
Golden Trailer Awards	Most Original Poster		Nominated
Golden Trailer Awards	Best Action Poster		Nominated
Hollywood Music in Media Awards	Best Original Score - Sci-Fi/Fantasy Film	James Newton Howard	Won
Hollywood Music in Media Awards	Best Song/Score - Trailer	Dawn	Won
Hollywood Music in Media Awards	Outstanding Original Score		Nominated
Kid's Choice Awards	Favorite Movie		Nominated
Kid's Choice Awards	Favorite Movie Actress	Jennifer Lawrence	Won
MTV Movie Awards	Best Action Performance	Jennifer Lawrence	Nominated
MTV Movie Awards	Best Hero	Jennifer Lawrence	Won
MTV Movie Awards	Ensemble Cast		Nominated
NewNowNext Awards	Next Must-See Movie		Won
Rembrandt Awards	Best International Film (Beste Buitenlandse Film)		Won
Saturn Awards	Best Fantasy Film		Nominated
SFX Awards	Best Film		Won
SFX Awards	Best SF or Fantasy Film		Nominated
Teen Choice Awards	Choice Movie: Sci-Fi/Fantasy		Nominated
Teen Choice Awards	Choice Movie Actress: Sci-Fi/Fantasy	Jennifer Lawrence	Won
Teen Choice Awards	Choice Movie Actor: Sci-Fi/Fantasy	Josh Hutcherson	Nominated
Teen Choice Awards	Choice Movie: Chemistry	Josh Hutcherson & Jennifer Lawrence	Nominated
Teen Choice Awards	Choice Movie: Liplock	Josh Hutcherson & Jennifer Lawrence	Won
Teen Choice Awards	Choice Movie: Scene Stealer	Jena Malone	Won
Women Film Critics Circle Awards	Best Female Images in a Movie	Jennifer Lawrence	Won

== Future ==
=== Potential spin-offs ===
In February 2015, nine months before the release of the film, Lionsgate CEO Jon Feltheimer revealed that they were "actively looking at some development and thinking about prequel and developments possibilities" for The Hunger Games, similar to Warner Bros. expanding the Wizarding World franchise with the then-upcoming Fantastic Beasts films. The studio reiterated the decision in December 2015. That same month, when asked about the idea of spin-offs to the franchise, Jennifer Lawrence said "I think it's too soon. They've got to let the body get cold, in my opinion." She also said she would not be involved in the spin-offs. On August 8, 2017, Variety reported that Lionsgate CEO Jon Feltheimer has expressed interest in having spin-offs made for the franchise if given approval by series author Suzanne Collins, and wants to create a writers room to explore the idea. In November 2026, Francis Lawrence and producer Nina Jacobson discussed the possibility of a prequel focusing on the character of Plutarch Heavensbee, played by Jesse Plemons in The Hunger Games: Sunrise on the Reaping (2026).

=== Prequels ===
On June 17, 2019, Joe Drake, Chairman of the Lionsgate Motion Picture Group, announced in an interview that the company is communicating and working closely with Collins with regards to an adaptation of her prequel Hunger Games novel, The Ballad of Songbirds and Snakes, which was released on May 19, 2020. He stated:

As the proud home of the Hunger Games movies, we can hardly wait for Suzanne’s next book to be published. We’ve been communicating with her during the writing process and we look forward to continuing to work closely with her on the movie.

In April 2020, Collins and Lionsgate confirmed plans were underway for the film's development. Francis Lawrence returned as director following his success with the last three Hunger Games films. Michael Arndt and Michael Lesslie wrote the script, with Nina Jacobson, Lawrence and Brad Smipson serving as producers. The film was released on November 17, 2023. Tom Blyth portrays a younger Coriolanus Snow while Rachel Zegler, Hunter Schafer, Jason Schwartzman, Peter Dinklage, Viola Davis, Burn Gorman, and Fionnula Flanagan were cast as Lucy Gray Baird, Tigris Snow, Lucretius "Lucky" Flickerman, Casca Highbottom, Dr. Volumnia Gaul, Commander Hoff, and Grandma'am, respectively.

A second prequel film, The Hunger Games: Sunrise on the Reaping, is scheduled for release on November 20, 2026. Francis Lawrence returned to direct from a script by Billy Ray and Michael Lesslie, adapted from the second prequel novel, Sunrise on the Reaping (2025). The principal cast includes Joseph Zada as a younger Haymitch, Mckenna Grace as Maysilee Donner, Ralph Fiennes as President Snow, and Whitney Peak as Lenore Dove. Jennifer Lawrence, Hutcherson, and Harrelson reprise their roles in an epilogue set after the events of Mockingjay.
