= Katniss Everdeen =

Main character in the Hunger Games universe

- The Hunger Games character
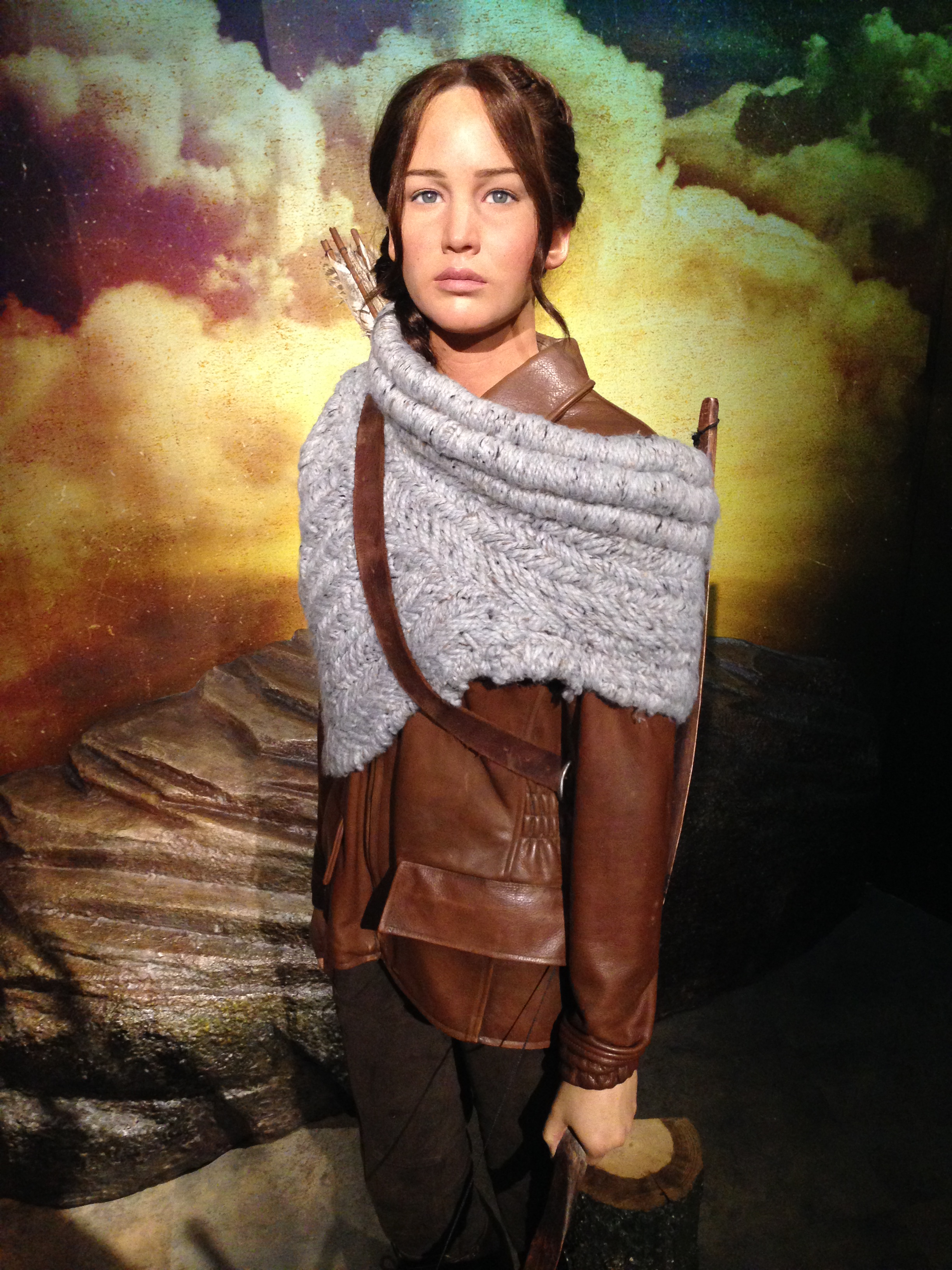
- Waxwork of Jennifer Lawrence as Katniss Everdeen at Madame Tussauds London
- First appearance: Literature: The Hunger Games (2008)
- Last appearance: Literature: Sunrise on the Reaping (2025)
- Created by: Suzanne Collins
- Portrayed by: Jennifer Lawrence (films); Mia Carragher (play)

In-universe information
- Aliases: The Girl on Fire; The Mockingjay
- Gender: Female
- Family: Burdock Everdeen (father, deceased); Asterid March (mother); Primrose Everdeen (younger sister, deceased)
- Spouse: Peeta Mellark
- Children: Unnamed son; Unnamed daughter

Katniss Everdeen is a fictional character and the protagonist of The Hunger Games trilogy written by American author Suzanne Collins. She is portrayed by Jennifer Lawrence in the film adaptations.

Katniss and her family live in District 12, a coal-mining region that is the poorest, least populated, and smallest domain in Panem—a dystopian autocratic nation in the ruins of North America, ruled over by the wealthy class living in the Capitol.

In the first book, The Hunger Games, Katniss competes as a "tribute" in a yearly fight to the death known as "The Hunger Games", volunteering to fight in place of her little sister, Primrose "Prim" Everdeen. Over the course of the trilogy, Katniss evolves from protector of her younger sister into a galvanizing symbol of rebellion against the Capitol's oppression. The rebellion against the Capitol is eventually victorious.

== Origins ==
The idea for the trilogy was based in part on the myth of Theseus and the Minotaur, in which every nine years, seven boys and seven girls from Athens are sent to Crete as tributes to that land to be devoured by the Minotaur, a cycle that continues until Theseus kills the Minotaur. Collins, who heard the story when she was eight years old, was unsettled by its ruthlessness and cruelty. Collins said, "In her own way, Katniss is a futuristic Theseus." Collins also characterized the novels with the fearful sensations she experienced when her father was fighting in the Vietnam War.

In the novels, Katniss is extensively knowledgeable in foraging, wildlife, hunting, and survival techniques. Collins knew some of this background from her father, who was forced to hunt to augment a scanty food supply, although Collins saw her father bring home food from the wild during her childhood as well. In addition, Collins researched the subject using a large stack of wilderness survival guidebooks.

Katniss and the other tributes are, in their time before participating in their Hunger Games, compelled to compete for the hearts of sponsors who donate money that can be used to buy vital supplies for them when they are in the arena such as medicine, matches, food, and water. The concept of how the audiences carry nearly as much force as actual characters is based on how, in reality television and in the Roman games, the audience can both "respond with great enthusiasm or play a role in your elimination," as Collins said.

=== Name ===
Katniss's first name comes from the edible arrowhead plant, which is known as katniss in the language of the Lenape. Additionally, Collins remarked in an interview that "its Latin name has the same roots as Sagitarrius, the archer."

Her last name comes from Bathsheba Everdene, the central female character in the 1874 novel Far from the Madding Crowd by Thomas Hardy. According to Collins, "The two are very different, but both struggle with knowing their hearts".

== Fictional character biography ==
=== The Hunger Games ===
The Hunger Games takes place in the ruins of North America: a country called Panem, consisting of the Capitol and 13 subservient districts. Katniss Everdeen was born on May 8 to Burdock and Asterid Everdeen (née March) in District 12. Her younger sister Primrose, often referred to as Prim, was born four years later. When Katniss was eleven, her father was killed in a coal mining explosion, causing Asterid to sink into a deep depression and leaving her unable to provide for the family. While the Everdeens were on the verge of starving to death, Katniss was given burnt bread by Peeta Mellark, the baker's son, after which Katniss learned how to hunt to support her family. While hunting in the woods surrounding District 12, she befriended Gale Hawthorne, and the two became hunting partners and worked together to support their families.

During the yearly Reaping of tributes to compete in the Hunger Games, Prim is selected as District 12's female tribute. Katniss volunteers to take Prim's place. After Katniss is brought up on stage, Peeta is reaped as the male tribute. When they arrive in the Capitol, Katniss is met by her prep team, Flavius, Octavia, and Venia, and her stylist Cinna, who prepare Katniss for the opening ceremonies. Coming from District 12, Katniss and Peeta expect to be dressed in coal mining costumes. Cinna and his partner Portia, however, decide to dress them in a plain black unitard and sleek boots with a cape that burns with fake flames. In addition, Cinna suggests they hold hands to present them as "together and a team" and rebellious towards the Capitol. Their costumes and camaraderie with each other distinguishes them from the other tributes, and attracts the attention of sponsors. Katniss is dubbed "The Girl On Fire".

As soon as they arrive, Peeta and Katniss are given two weeks of training and coaching with mentor Haymitch Abernathy and Capitol escort Effie Trinket. During this training, she forms a bond with Rue, the 12-year-old female tribute from District 11, and have to appear close to each other on Haymitch's orders. During their private training session, Katniss shoots an arrow at the Gamemakers' food, scoring her an 11 out of 12.

During the Games, Katniss escapes the initial bloodbath without claiming the bow and arrows from the Cornucopia, the large structure in the center of the arena holding supplies for the Tributes. She is forced to hide in a tree after the Career pack—an alliance between the ultra-competitive Districts 1, 2, and 4—comes after her. She escapes by cutting a nest of genetically modified wasps called tracker jackers out of the tree, causing the wasps to attack the Careers and sting Katniss several times, causing her to experience extreme hallucinations and pass out, though she claims the bow and arrow from a fallen Career tribute before she does. After Rue heals Katniss's wounds from the tracker jacker venom with an apothecary remedy, she and Katniss become allies to destroy the Career pack's supplies. Afterwards, Rue is killed by Marvel, the male tribute from District 1, and dies in Katniss's arms. To defy the Capitol, Katniss arranges flowers around Rue's body before a hovercraft removes it from the arena. Later, the rules are changed so that if the remaining two tributes come from the same district, they will both become victors. Katniss hurries to find Peeta, who is seriously injured from saving Katniss from Cato. They resume their "star-crossed lovers" reputation, gaining sympathy from sponsors. The rule change is soon revoked, meaning there can only be one victor of the Hunger Games. Katniss suggests she and Peeta commit suicide by eating poisonous berries. The Gamemakers want at least one victor, so Katniss and Peeta are both declared victors of the 74th Hunger Games seconds before ingesting the berries. However, she is warned by Haymitch that her actions in the Games may come back to haunt her, while also realizing Peeta's feelings for her are genuine.

=== Catching Fire ===
Katniss and Peeta go on the Victory Tour, which is a visit to each district by the winners, strategically placed between each Hunger Games. Katniss becomes aware that uprisings are erupting. President Snow asks Katniss to convince the nation she is really in love with Peeta to quell dissent. To save her family and friends, Katniss agrees to follow the Capitol's agenda.

Peeta proposes marriage to her, and she accepts, but even at that point, President Snow conveys to her that her actions are insufficient. Katniss comes to realize the rebellion in the districts is not within her power to suppress, making it impossible for her to satisfy President Snow's demands. Katniss is also confused as to the nature of her feelings for both Gale and Peeta, both of whom are complicated by her fears for the future and her unwillingness to have children who themselves could be subjected to the Hunger Games. When the Quarter Quell is announced, it is proclaimed that all of the current year's tributes will be selected from the pool of previous Hunger Games victors. District 12 has only three living victors: Katniss, Peeta, and Haymitch, who won the 50th Games and successfully mentored Katniss the year before. As Katniss is the only living female victor in District 12, she is the only possible female tribute, and Peeta volunteers to take Haymitch's place when Haymitch is selected. Katniss and Peeta return to the arena, working closely to survive and forming alliances and close friendships in the process, particularly with Finnick Odair, who resuscitated Peeta in the arena. During this time Katniss begins to realize she has feelings for Peeta.

Katniss is taken from the arena and discovers the tributes of many districts, including her ally Finnick Odair, had coordinated an escape plan and used a stolen hovercraft to fly to District 13, which was not destroyed as the Capitol had claimed. However, during the escape, Peeta and Johanna are captured by the Capitol, and afterward, Gale informs Katniss that District 12 was bombed and destroyed, but that her family is safe.

=== Mockingjay ===
Katniss is rescued and taken to the subterranean civilization of District 13 and meets with the people and their leader, President Alma Coin. She is then taken to see the remains of District 12. Deeply affected by this, Katniss agrees to be the symbolic leader of their rebellion: "the Mockingjay", the face of the rebels. She discovers Cinna has been killed by the Capitol, but the rest of her prep team survived in District 13's captivity. They prep Katniss for the cameras when she agrees to start doing propaganda pieces for the rebels. A love triangle between Katniss, Peeta, and Gale slowly unfolds, forcing Katniss to decide whom she wants to be with. The situation is complicated by the fact Peeta is currently being tortured in the Capitol while Gale is at Katniss's side. Katniss also forms a bond of friendship with Finnick, who goes through the same pain she is going through and can understand her situation. Katniss becomes increasingly emotionally unstable by the events of the revolution. After a rescue mission in which a team from District 13 brings Peeta back, she finds out his memories have been hijacked by tracker jacker venom. He now hates and wants to kill Katniss, believing she is a genetically modified "muttation" created by the Capitol. Katniss becomes even more determined to kill Snow after this.

She, along with a group of sharpshooters that include Gale, Finnick, and later Peeta sneak into the Capitol at the cost of several of their own lives in an attempt to kill Snow. Along the way, they encounter sadistic traps created by game makers to make sport of their deaths. As the remaining team gets close to the presidential mansion, an array of bombs are dropped from a Hovercraft, with only some exploding, killing the refugee Capitol children on whom they were dropped. Rebel medics, including Prim, rush to help the children, but as they arrive the rest of the bombs explode. Prim is killed in front of Katniss, while Katniss's body is severely burned. Although she makes a remarkable physical recovery, Katniss temporarily loses the ability to speak, traumatized by the death of her sister. It is possible Gale was involved in the making of the bombs that killed Prim, although he denies knowing civilians would be attacked.

Meanwhile, President Snow is arrested, found guilty of his crimes against the people of Panem, and sentenced to death. Per Katniss's request, she is designated as his executioner. Before the execution, Snow tells Katniss the bombs weren't his but the rebels' way of gaining sympathy in the Capitol for their cause, making it look like the work of Snow. Although she initially refuses to believe Snow, Katniss realizes the attack method was identical to a trap Gale and fellow Quarter Quell tribute Beetee had designed. Eventually, Katniss realizes someone high up in the ranks of the Rebels would have had to order to have Prim on the front line, despite her age. She comes to suspect Coin ordered the attack on the children to trick the Capitol citizens into thinking the government had killed their children.

Furthermore, Coin suggests there will be one last Hunger Games where the children from the Capitol will be reaped. She seeks the approval of the surviving victors before making these games official, and Katniss votes yes as a means of gaining Coin's trust. During the supposed execution of Snow, she instead shoots Coin, due to her being responsible for Prim's death. She then attempts to kill herself with the suicide pill attached to her uniform, but Peeta stops her. She is arrested and placed in solitary confinement, where she attempts to commit suicide by starving herself and overdosing. However, she is ultimately released on the grounds she wasn't mentally well at the time of the assassination and is sent back to District 12. Katniss, accompanied by Haymitch, goes back to her home in Victor's Village and is put under care.

Driven into a deep depression, Katniss refuses to leave her house until Peeta returns to District 12 to plant primroses outside, in memory of her sister. Katniss begins to regain her mental health, and she and Peeta deal with their feelings by creating a book composed of information about deceased tributes, friends, and family. The novel ends with Katniss admitting she does indeed love Peeta.

In the epilogue, Katniss and Peeta are married and have a young daughter and son. Katniss still suffers nightmares about the games and fears having to eventually relay the story to her children. To soothe her traumatized psyche, Katniss makes a list in her mind of every act of kindness she has ever seen, an obsession that she realizes has simply become a "repetitive game" to keep darker thoughts at bay.

=== Sunrise on the Reaping ===
Sunrise on the Reaping recounts the story of Katniss's mentor, Haymitch Abernathy. In the epilogue, Haymitch notes how much Katniss as a child had reminded him of his old ally Louella McCoy. He says that Katniss not only shows some of his character traits, Katniss actually reminds him of himself. A luckier version, as he says. He states that the adult, post-war Peeta and Katniss were putting together a "memorial book" of the war, and that he had shared his memories of the Hunger Games with them. Katniss is depicted as bringing Haymitch goose eggs, and Peeta as building an incubator for the eggs.

== Characterization ==
=== Background ===
Katniss and her family live in the futuristic nation of Panem, located on the continent once known as North America, which was destroyed in a global catastrophe. Panem is run by an all-powerful city called the Capitol, located in the Rocky Mountains, which is surrounded by 12 districts, each having a specific purpose in supplying something to the Capitol. The story starts in District 12, Katniss's home, the coal-mining district. District 12, in the Appalachian Mountains, is the poorest of the districts, and Katniss lives with her mother and sister in the poorest part of town, known as the Seam.

Katniss's father, a coal miner, was killed in a mine explosion when Katniss was 11. After his death, Katniss's mother went into a deep depression and was unable to take care of her children. On the brink of starvation a few weeks before her twelfth birthday Katniss wandered into the richer part of town, hoping to steal some scraps from the garbage bins of rich merchants. The baker's son, Peeta, whom she did not know, took a beating from his mother for intentionally burning two loaves of bread, knowing that he would be told to throw them out. He was told to give the two loaves of bread to the pig but instead gave them to Katniss. Katniss took them home to her family, who had not eaten in days. The bread gave them hope and kept them motivated, leaving Katniss feeling resentfully indebted to Peeta.

A few days after the incident with the bread, Katniss decided to go into the woods surrounding her district to hunt illegally and gather plants to eat, which was how her father had gotten most of the family's food before he died. There, she met a boy named Gale Hawthorne. Together, they provide for both their families and develop a strong friendship. Before Katniss went into the 74th Hunger Games, she told Prim that Gale would bring her game and edible plants, to let them pull through this terrible time.

Katniss's mother slowly surfaces from her depression and is able to return to her job as an apothecary; Katniss makes an effort to forgive her. However, despite her mending relationship with her mother, strong friendship with Gale, and the increasingly strong affections she gains for Peeta, Katniss remains adamant that Prim, her younger sister, is "the only person she's certain she loves".

=== Personality ===
Collins has described Katniss as being an independent, strong survivalist, lethal, but good at thinking outside the box. Katniss's father's death, her mother's depression, and nearly starving have made her dedicated to overcoming hardship. She has shown she will protect those she loves, no matter the cost to herself.

Because the majority of her time before the Games was spent keeping herself and her family alive in a small, impoverished mountain community, Katniss is often ignorant of other people's thoughts and emotions. She is wary and distrustful, due to having to be a survivor much of her life. Because of this, Katniss is slow to make friends, and is often impatient. For those she takes to or who manage to win her over, however, Katniss is deeply loyal, modest and compassionate, and appreciating fellow survivors. Prior to the 74th Hunger Games, she had no interest in ever getting married or having children, since they would inevitably be subject to the Reaping.

During the 74th and 75th Hunger Games, Katniss quickly adapts to the "kill or be killed" philosophy of the Games and coldly considers how she will kill her fellow competitors during the first Games. Despite this, she is disturbed when she kills a fellow competitor. By the end of the first Games, she is prepared to shoot Cato and attempts to do so only to be interrupted by Peeta being attacked by the mutations. As the series progresses, however, she becomes increasingly cold-blooded, to the point where she and Peeta discuss how to kill everyone involved in her second Hunger Games in Catching Fire. By the third novel, she is mostly numb to the concept of killing others, although she does feel remorse when accidentally killing an unarmed female civilian. When Peeta's mind is hijacked by the Capitol, Katniss feels he is justified in hating her due to killing so many people.

In Catching Fire, Katniss struggles to understand the nuances and complexities of Panem's political issues, having little formal education and practically no interest in politics whatsoever. Over time, however, Katniss gradually realizes there are more important things than survival and becomes deeply invested in her relationships with the country around her. Her often-difficult temperament and personality, along with a lack of interest or ambition in regards to fame, rank, or power, cause her return to District 12 after the Games are over. She expresses at the end of the third book that she never wanted a life outside her district to begin with, and only wants to be free from President Snow and the Capitol.

=== Skills ===
Katniss is a highly skilled archer, hunter, and trapper, having learned these from her father and Gale. She uses her archery skills during the pre-games judging and receives a score of 11 out of 12. She has been well educated on the plant life of District 12. Additionally, she has a beautiful singing voice that can make mockingjays go quiet, despite this being abnormal behavior for them. Katniss is a skilled tree-climber, which has benefited her in hunting and the Games. She is usually very logical, but her emotions can sometimes get in the way.

=== Physical appearance ===
Katniss is described as having "straight black hair, olive skin, and grey eyes", which are typical characteristics of the Seam; the poorest area of District 12. Katniss normally wears her hair in a long braid down her back. She is thin and fairly short, but is strong for her size from hunting to feed her family in the woods outside of District 12. Katniss is sixteen years old during the 74th Hunger Games, and seventeen years old during the Quarter Quell and the Rebellion. She also wears a pin of a Mockingjay during the games to represent good luck.

== Critical reception ==
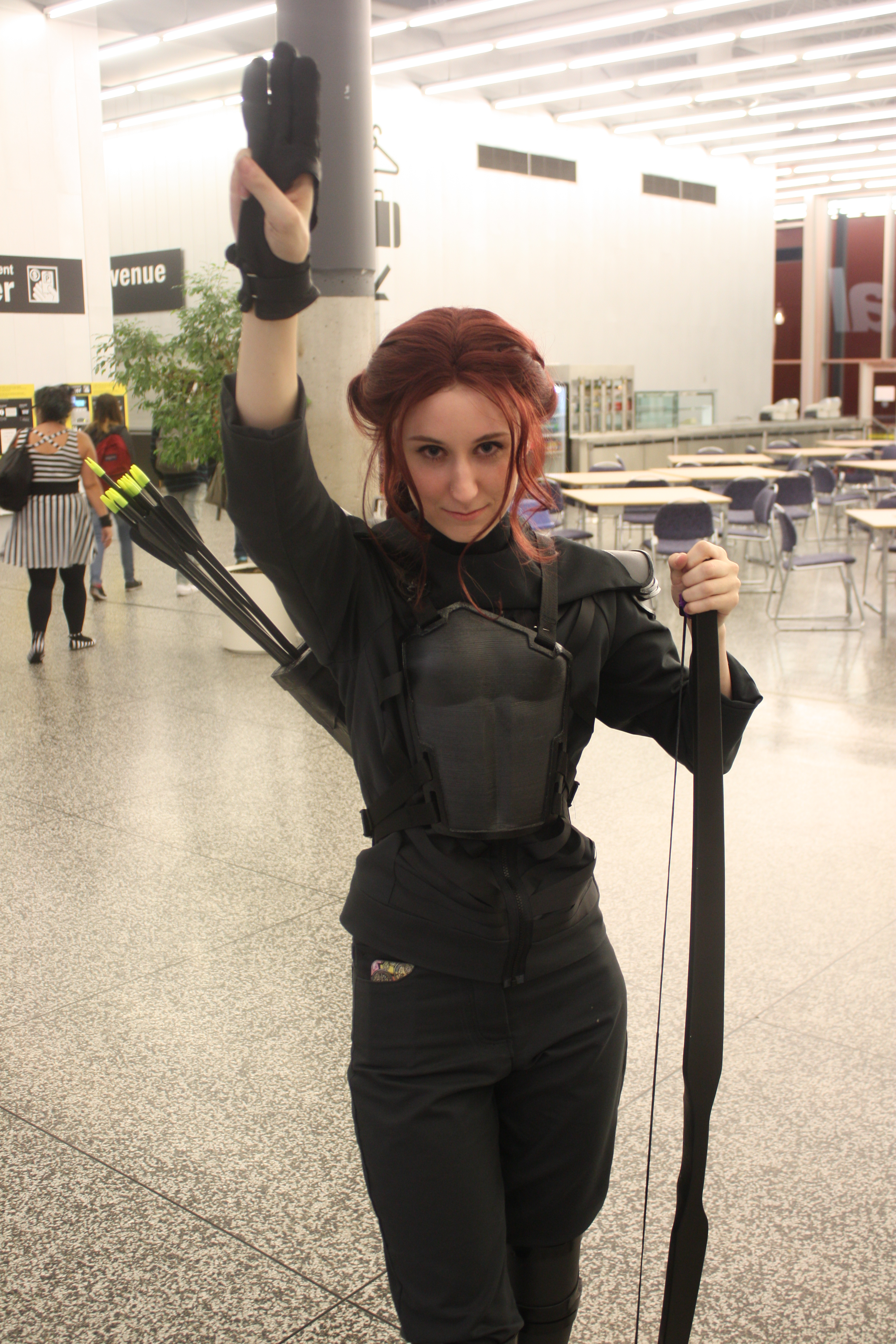
A cosplayer dressed as Katniss Everdeen during the Montreal Comiccon, July 2015

Katniss has received mostly positive reviews. In a review for The Hunger Games, Stephen King said she was a "cool kid" with a "lame name," before adding, "once I got over [her] name...I got to like her a lot." Francisca Goldsmith in Booklist said, "Although Katniss may be skilled with a bow and arrow and adept at analyzing her opponents' next moves, she has much to learn about personal sentiments, especially her own." Publishers Weekly says, "It's a credit to Collins's skill at characterization that Katniss, like a new Theseus, is cold, calculating and still likable." The Cleveland Plain Dealer stated in a review for Catching Fire that "Katniss in a pensive mood seems out of step with the kick-butt assassin," before adding that her loyalty and kindheartedness were enjoyed. John Green, in The New York Times, called Katniss a "memorably complex and fascinating heroine". Also in The New York Times, Katie Roiphe said that Katniss in Mockingjay was "a great character without being exactly likeable. [She] is bossy, moody, bratty, demanding, prickly", and commented that this is what makes many recent literature heroines likeable. Entertainment Weekly compared Katniss to Bella Swan from the Twilight Saga and said "unlike Twilight's passive, angsty Bella, Katniss is a self-possessed young woman who demonstrates equal parts compassion and fearlessness."

Laura Miller of Salon.com finds Katniss too virtuous and without motivation, negatively contrasting Katniss to Bella of Twilight, saying, "In some ways, Katniss is more passive than Bella, allowed to have all kinds of goodies but only if she demonstrates her virtue by not really wanting them in the first place," and, "For all her irritating flaws, Bella, at least, has the courage of her desire. For what, besides a well-earned vengeance, does Katniss Everdeen truly hunger?" However, Miller did think that she was "in many respects an improvement on...Bella". However, The Daily Telegraph's David Gritten labelled her "a great role model for girls" who "has love interests, but doesn't mope passively over boys".

Daniel D'Addario of Time stated: "The Hunger Games heroine has already secured her status as a feminist role model and a box-office powerhouse. But Katniss is more than a movie icon now: Her three-fingered salute, used in Mockingjay as a signal of rebellion against the Capitol, has become a rallying symbol among pro-democracy protesters in Thailand and Hong Kong.

== Film adaptation ==
Actresses Lyndsy Fonseca and Kaya Scodelario expressed interest in the film and received scripts in October 2010, while Oscar-nominated actress Hailee Steinfeld met with director Gary Ross. Chloë Grace Moretz, Malese Jow, and Jodelle Ferland publicly expressed interest in playing Katniss. Director Scott Derrickson, who had met with Lionsgate to potentially direct the film, considered Naya Rivera for the role. Lionsgate considered about 30 actresses, including Jennifer Lawrence, Abigail Breslin, Emma Roberts, Saoirse Ronan, Emily Browning, and Shailene Woodley, as well as Steinfeld, Moretz, Fonseca, and Scodelario.

On March 16, 2011, it was announced that Jennifer Lawrence had been cast as Katniss. Lawrence, a fan of the books, took three days to accept the role, initially intimidated by the size of the production. Lawrence was 20 at the time, older than the 16-year-old character. However, author Suzanne Collins said the actress who plays Katniss has to have "a certain maturity and power" and said she would rather the actress be older than younger. Collins stated that Lawrence was the "only one who truly captured the character I wrote in the book" and she had "every essential quality necessary to play Katniss."

Lawrence later said that women had not previously played the lead roles of action films and that she felt significant responsibility towards the child audience. She commented that the "biggest conversation" was how much weight she would lose to play Katniss, but that she was wary of children feeling unable to dress up as Katniss because of their weight.

Lawrence ultimately won several accolades for her performance, including a Critics' Choice Movie Award for Best Actress in an Action Movie in 2013 and an MTV Movie Award for Best Female Performance in 2012 and 2014, as well as an MTV Movie Award for Best Hero (2016).

The Hollywood Reporter has confirmed that Lawrence is set to reprise her role as Katniss Everdeen in the upcoming prequel to the original Hunger Games films, The Hunger Games: Sunrise on the Reaping, which is releasing November 20, 2026.
