= Tim O'Brien (illustrator) =

American artist (born 1964)

- Born: November 16, 1964 (age 62); New Haven, Connecticut, U.S.
- Education: Paier College of Art
- Known for: Illustration, fine artist
- Awards: Hamilton King Award, 2009; Medals, Society of Illustrators, Graphis, The Art Directors Club, Society of Publication Designers
- Website: obrienillustration.com

Tim O'Brien (born November 16, 1964) is an American artist who works in a realistic style. His illustrations have appeared on the covers and interior pages of magazines such as Time, Rolling Stone, GQ, Esquire, National Geographic, Der Spiegel, and others. His illustrations are also used by the US Postal Service for postage stamps.

== Early life and education ==
O'Brien's paternal grandparents came from Ireland, and his maternal grandparents from Norwich, Connecticut, arriving in the United States from Quebec. His grandfather became a caretaker at Yale University.

O'Brien was the second of three sons in his family. O'Brien began training as a boxer in high school, going on to box as a middleweight amateur in the Police Athletic League. At age 18, O'Brien gave up boxing. That same year he received a Pell Grant which he used to enroll in the Paier College of Art in New Haven, Connecticut. He graduated in 1987 with a Bachelor of Fine Arts degree. His instructors at Paier included Leonard Everett Fisher, Ken Davies and Robert Zappalorti. While attending Paier, O'Brien painted trompe-l'œil images, which his instructors Davies and Zappalorti were also known to do, in which the viewer of the paintings are deceived into thinking they were seeing an actual object. In one such case, students attempted to use electrical outlets that O'Brien had painted on the wall.

=== Artistic influences ===
In grade school, O'Brien often visited the Yale University Art Gallery. O'Brien's favorite art works at the Yale Gallery were by Thomas Eakins and Paul Cadmus. Other early influences for O'Brien were the 19th-century Russian painter Ivan Shishkin, and British painter Lord Leighton. Later influences for O'Brien include various contemporary artists such as Gottfried Helnwein, George Tooker and Mark Tansey, as well as illustrators such as Guy Billout and David Suter.

== Career ==
Before graduating from Paier in 1987, O'Brien entered into what became a long relationship with his representative Peter Lott. Lott had seen O'Brien's work at the Society of Illustrators Student Show.

O'Brien started his illustration career primarily as a book cover artist and continues to work for book publishing houses. He has created covers for books by Ray Bradbury, Thomas Hardy, Walter Dean Myers and others.

O'Brien credits his first big break as a Time magazine cover done in 1989, painting a small teardrop overlaid on a Gilbert Stuart portrait of George Washington. O'Brien was called on again in 2008 to paint another teardrop on the cover of Time, for the cover story "The Price Of Greed" following the onset of a global financial recession.

== Technique and tools ==
An oil painting by O'Brien may begin with a variety of mediums and techniques — a pencil drawing on a gessoed panel, charcoal, gouache and finally layers of oil paint.

== Notable works ==
=== Book covers ===
In 1996, O'Brien designed the cover for book #2 The Visitor in K.A. Applegate's Animorphs series.

Between 2008 and 2010, O'Brien was commissioned by Scholastic Publishing to illustrate each cover of The Hunger Games trilogy by Suzanne Collins, including the Hunger Games "mockingjay" logo. The images were then used again for promotional posters when the film distributor Lionsgate turned the books into a film franchise.

O'Brien closely collaborated on the designs with his wife, Elizabeth Parisi, creative director for Scholastic.

=== Time covers ===
Tim O'Brien has illustrated more covers than any other artist for the last 30 years. O'Brien's Time magazine covers are in the National Portrait Gallery of the Smithsonian Institution. Starting in 1989, O'Brien worked with art director Arthur Hochstein, and created over a dozen covers for Time with him.

O'Brien's "The End of Bin Laden" cover, which the artist created in 2002 when editors at Time believed the al-Qaeda leader was trapped and was or would soon be dead in Afghanistan, was not published until nine years later in the May 20, 2011, issue. O'Brien used a similar approach for an earlier Time cover, "The Death of Abu Mousab al-Zarqawi", for the June 19, 2006, issue of the magazine. As of 2020, O'Brien has had over 30 Time covers published, including:

- September 4, 1996 The Choice
- December 28, 1998 Men of the Year, Kenneth Star and Bill Clinton
- March 10, 2003 Life After Saddam
- November 10, 2008 The Choice
- June 7, 2010 Why Being Pope Means Never Having to Say You're Sorry
- December 20, 2010 Palin in Progress
- May 20, 2011 The End of Bin Laden
- September 5, 2011 The World After Gaddafi
- February 27, 2017 ‘’Nothing to see here”

=== Rolling Stone ===
O'Brien illustrated portraits of the Police, Michael Jackson, Nirvana, and Little Richard in Rolling Stone's 100 Greatest Artists of All Time.

In 2012, O'Brien said the work he was most proud of was his 2008 cover illustration for Rolling Stone in which the magazine endorsed candidate Barack Obama for president. The cover, which depicted the future president with a halo-like glow around him, created a mild controversy, with critics of the image saying it deified the candidate.

Covers

- March 2008 cover, Barack Obama, A New Hope
- January 2009 cover, Bush Apologizes
- February 2012 cover, The Rise and Fall of Ziggy Stardust

Page illustrations

- Al Gore: The Revolution is Beginning, June 28, 2007
- Beck, March 2014

=== Mother Jones ===
For the December 2012 release, Mother Jones printed double covers, in which one cover was sent to subscribers of the magazine and the alternate cover was shown on newsstands. O'Brien illustrated both covers in different styles. For the cover that went to newsstands, titled Sugar Kills, O'Brien created a surreal vignette of a glass pitcher as a human skull. For the version delivered to subscribers, titled Solitary in Iran, O'Brien painted a lonely jail cell with a single occupant.

Covers

- February 2008 The Last Empire
- September 2010, The BP Coverup
- March 2011, The Vampire Economy
- July 2013, Gagged by Big Ag

Page illustrations

- Harpy, Hero, Heretic: Hillary, January 2007

=== Other magazines ===
O'Brien's magazine covers have received awards and citations, including Cover of the Day by the Society of Publication Designers.

- The Atlantic, April 2001, The Next Ruling Class
- Smithsonian, March 2012, 100th Anniversary of The Titantic
- Sports Illustrated, March 2011, Roger Goodell Throne of Games
- Sports Illustrated, May 16, 2016, Vin Scully
- GQ, July 2015, Who is Mitt Romney?
- GQ, January 2016, What Would Cool Jesus Do?

=== Postage stamps ===
O'Brien's work first appeared on U.S. postage stamps in 2006. He was commissioned to portray Hattie McDaniel as part of the U.S. Postal Services Black Heritage stamp series.

O'Brien also designed postage stamps of Judy Garland in 2006; Danny Thomas in 2012; Shirley Temple in 2016; and Father Theodore Hesburgh in 2017.

== Honors and service ==
On April 26, 2016, O'Brien spoke at the United Nations in New York City at the invitation of the World Intellectual Property Organization, during which his artwork was shown. He discussed commercial art and intellectual property rights in a digital world and how technology is having both advantageous and troubling consequences on both.

=== Honors ===
- Society of Illustrators Hall of Fame, Society of Illustrators (2025)
- Hamilton King Award, Society of Illustrators (2009)
- Honorary doctorate degree, 2013, Lyme Academy College of Fine Arts
- Commencement speech at Paier College of Art, 1996 and 2002
- O'Brien's Time magazine covers are in the collection of the National Gallery of Art, Washington, DC
- Chosen by Irish American Magazine as one of their 100 top Irish Americans, 1999 and 2000
- Awards from Society of Illustrators in New York and Los Angeles: Graphis Inc.; Print Magazine; Communication Arts Magazine; the Society of Publication Designers; American Illustration; Art Director's Club
- In 2019, Tim O'Brien was awarded all three top illustration awards; bronze, silver and gold, for covers of Donald Trump for Time.

=== Service ===
- Chairman of the Education Committee, Society of Illustrators, New York (1996–2006).
- Member of the Executive Committee, Society of Illustrators, New York
- Served on the Board of the Illustration Conference in 2003
- President of the Society of Illustrators, New York 2014-2022
- Chairman of 'Illustrators 49' at the Society of Illustrators
- Chairman of the Scholarship Committee at the Society of Illustrators

=== Exhibitions ===
- Lyme Academy of Fine Arts, Portraits and Illustrations: A Retrospective, 2013
- Norman Rockwell Museum, Rockwell and Realism in an Abstract World, 2016
- Corpo Gallery

== Teaching ==
O'Brien lectures frequently across the country. His speaking engagements have included the Norman Rockwell Museum, the Society of Illustrators, Syracuse University, School of Visual Arts, Pratt Institute, Rhode Island School of Design, and California College of the Arts.

He was a distinguished adjunct professor of illustration at the University of the Arts from 1990–2016. He also taught as an adjunct professor at Pratt Institute (2009–present) and Paier College of Art (1994–1996).

== Personal life ==
Up until 2004, O'Brien stayed active in the boxing world of his youth as a trainer. Since 2006, O'Brien has run the New York City Marathon, raising money for the Children's IBD Center at Mount Sinai Hospital.

O'Brien lives with his wife Elizabeth Parisi and son in Brooklyn, New York.
