= List of accolades received by The Hunger Games film series =

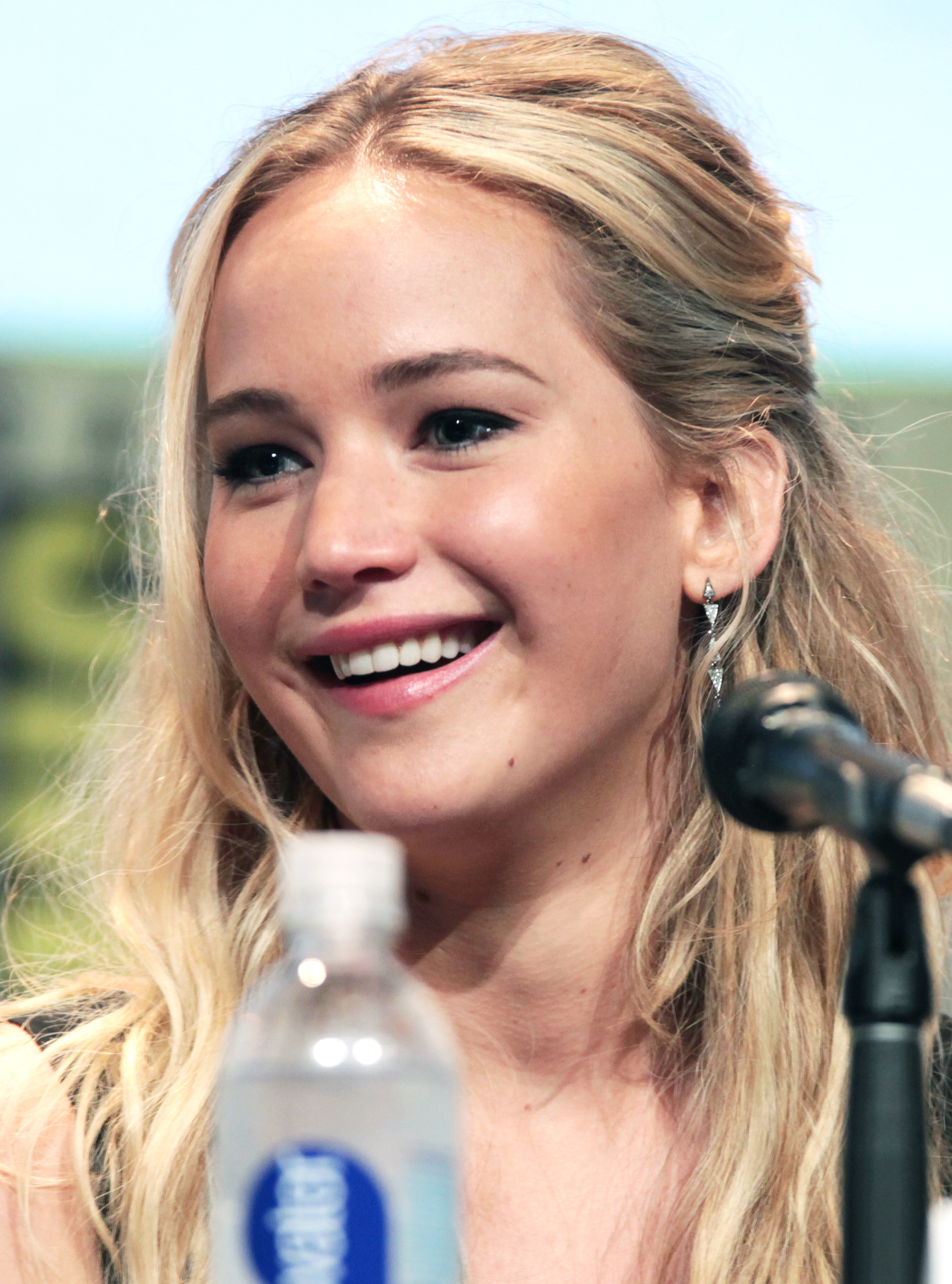
- Jennifer Lawrence received numerous awards and nominations for her performance in the series.
Accolades
Award	Wins	Nominations
AARP Movies for Grownups Awards	0	1
Alliance of Women Film Journalists	0	3
ASCAP Film and Television Music Awards	1	1
Artios Awards	0	2
Black Reel Awards	0	2
British Academy Children's Awards	1	2
CMT Music Awards	0	2
Costume Designers Guild Awards	1	5
Critics' Choice Awards	1	7
Denver Film Critics Society Awards	0	1
Detroit Film Critics Society Awards	0	1
Do Something! Awards	1	2
Empire Awards	2	9
Georgia Film Critics Association	0	1
Golden Globe Awards	0	3
Golden Trailer Awards	2	8
Grammy Awards	1	3
Hollywood Film Awards	1	1
Hollywood Music in Media Awards	1	2
Hugo Awards	0	2
Kerrang! Awards	1	1
Kids' Choice Awards	8	13
London Film Critics' Circle	0	1
Make-Up Artists and Hair Stylists Guild	0	1
MTV Movie Awards	9	26
NAACP Image Awards	0	2
Nebula Awards	0	2
NewNowNext Awards	2	2
North Carolina Film Critics Association	0	2
People's Choice Awards	9	13
San Diego Film Critics Society Awards	7	8
Saturn Awards	2	17
Set Decorators Society of America Awards	0	1
Society of Composers & Lyricists Awards	1	1
Society of Operating Cameramen Awards	0	1
Teen Choice Awards	15	22
Women Film Critics Circle Awards	1	1
Young Hollywood Awards	0	3

Totals (Note: Certain award groups do not simply award one winner. They acknowledge several different recipients, have runners-up, and have third place. Since this is a specific recognition and is different from losing an award, runner-up mentions are considered wins in this award tally. For simplification and to avoid errors, each award in this list has been presumed to have had a prior nomination.)
- Wins: 65
- Nominations: 167

The Hunger Games film series consists of five dystopian action films based on The Hunger Games novels by the American author Suzanne Collins. The five films, entitled The Hunger Games, The Hunger Games: Catching Fire, The Hunger Games: Mockingjay – Part 1, The Hunger Games: Mockingjay – Part 2 and The Hunger Games: The Ballad of Songbirds & Snakes, were released serially worldwide between March 2012 and November 2023. A sixth installment, titled The Hunger Games: Sunrise on the Reaping, is set to be released in movie theaters on November 20, 2026. The first film was directed by Gary Ross, while the other four were directed by Francis Lawrence. Distributed by Lionsgate and produced by Nina Jacobson, the series stars Jennifer Lawrence, Josh Hutcherson and Liam Hemsworth as the three leading characters, Katniss Everdeen, Peeta Mellark and Gale Hawthorne, in the first four films. Tom Blyth and Rachel Zegler star as the lead characters Coriolanus "Coryo" Snow and Lucy Gray Baird in The Hunger Games: The Ballad of Songbirds and Snakes. In The Hunger Games: Sunrise on the Reaping, Snow will be portrayed by Ralph Fiennes while Joseph Zada and Mckenna Grace will star as Haymitch Abernathy and Maysilee Donner, respectively.

Every film was a financial success and achieved blockbuster status. The Hunger Games grossed over $694 million worldwide against its budget of $78 million, making it the third-highest-grossing film in the United States, only behind The Avengers and The Dark Knight Rises, and ninth-highest-grossing worldwide of 2012. The Hunger Games: Catching Fire topped the highest-grossing film at the domestic box office of 2013. It also grossed over $865 million worldwide and is currently the highest-grossing entry in The Hunger Games series. The Hunger Games: Mockingjay – Part 1 ranked second at the domestic office of 2014, grossing $337 million, while over $755 million worldwide. Part 2 has grossed $281 million in North America, with a total of $652 million worldwide. The Hunger Games: The Ballad of Songbirds & Snakes has grossed $165.9 million in United States and Canada and $336.5 million worldwide.

Overall, the film series received positive reception from critics. The Hunger Games scored an 84% rating based on a sample of 277 reviews on review aggregator Rotten Tomatoes with an average of 7.2/10. The second entry performed even better with critics, garnering an approval rating of 89%, with an average of 7.5/10. The Hunger Games: Mockingjay – Part 1 scored a 69% rating based on 293 reviews, while Part 2 had a 70% rating, with average of 6.5/10, based on 231 reviews. The Hunger Games: The Ballad of Songbirds & Snakes scored a 64% rating based on 233 reviews, the lowest score in the franchise.

The Hunger Games film series received awards and nominations in a variety of categories with particular praise for its direction, screenplay and the performances of Jennifer Lawrence. The series won nine MTV Movie Awards out of twenty-six nominations, nine People's Choice Awards out of thirteenth nominations and received three Grammy Awards and Golden Globe Awards nominations, winning a Grammy Award for Best Song Written for Visual Media for "Safe & Sound".

== The Hunger Games ==
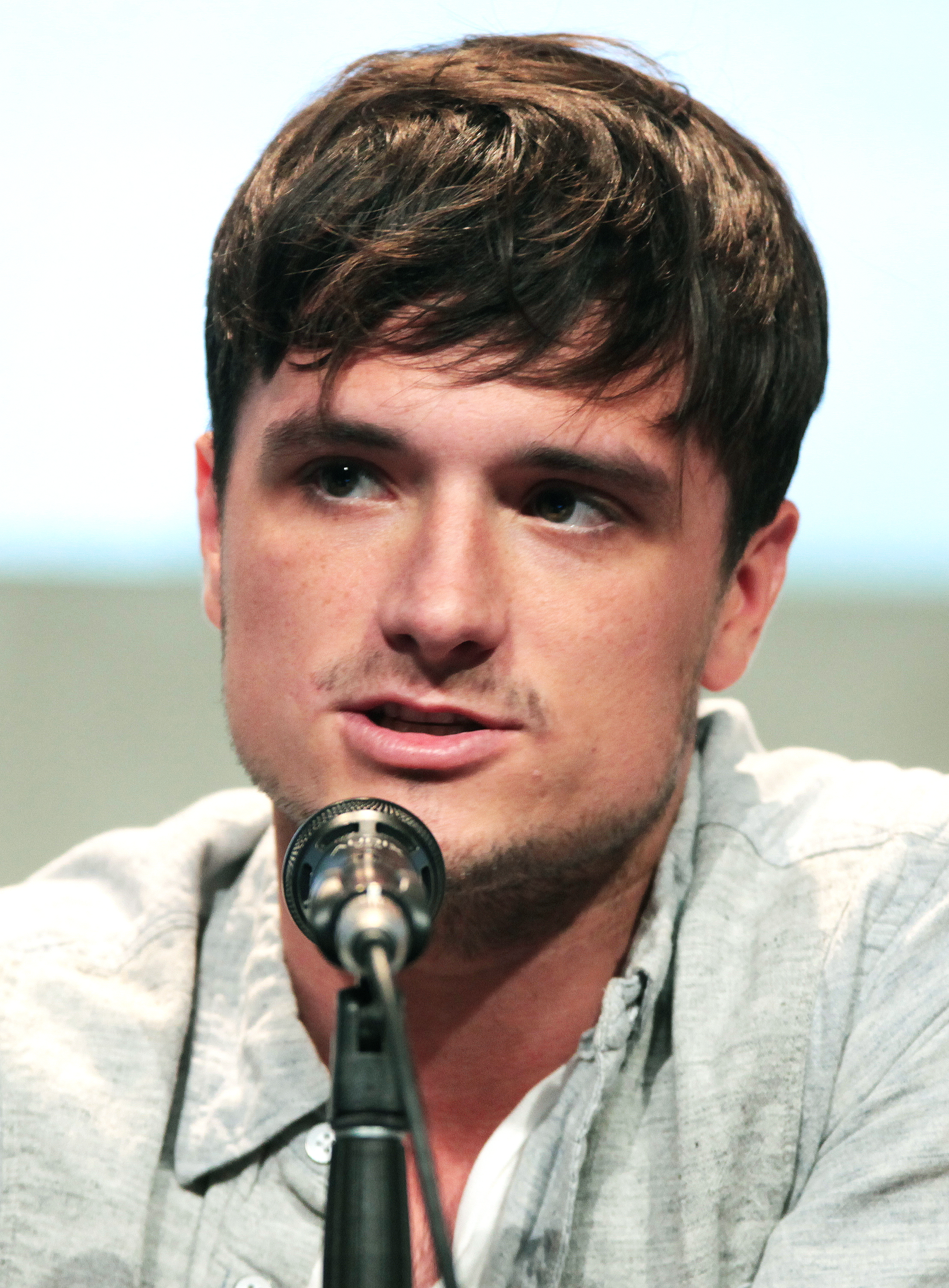
Josh Hutcherson portrays Peeta Mellark.

The first film in the franchise, The Hunger Games was released in theatres in the US on March 23, 2012. The story takes place in a dystopian post-apocalyptic future in the nation of Panem, where boys and girls between the ages of 12 and 18 must take part in the Hunger Games, a televised annual event in which the "tributes" are required to fight to the death until there is one remaining who will be crowned the victor. Katniss Everdeen (Jennifer Lawrence) volunteers to take her younger sister's place in the games. Joined by her district's male tribute Peeta Mellark (Josh Hutcherson), Katniss travels to the Capitol to train for the Hunger Games under the guidance of former victor Haymitch Abernathy (Woody Harrelson).

The Hunger Games received fifty-one nominations, and won twenty-eight. The song "Safe & Sound" won a Grammy Award and was nominated for a Golden Globe Award for Best Original Song. For her performance, Lawrence won the Saturn Award and the Empire Award for Best Actress, and the Critics' Choice Awards for Best Actress in an Action Movie. The film itself received twelve nominations, winning the award for Favorite Movie at the People's Choice Awards and at the Kids' Choice Awards. Meanwhile, Hutcherson won a MTV Movie Award for Best Male Performance, a Teen Choice Award for Choice Movie Actor – Sci-Fi/Fantasy and a Do Something! Awards for Best Male Movie Star, and Elizabeth Banks won the MTV Movie Award for Best On-Screen Transformation.

Award	Date of ceremony	Category	Recipients	Result	Ref.
ASCAP Film and Television Music Awards	June 20, 2013	Top Box Office Films	James Newton Howard	Won	
Artios Awards	January 10, 2013	Big Budget Feature – Drama	Debra Zane and Jackie Burch	Nominated	
Black Reel Awards	February 7, 2013	Best Breakthrough Performance	Amandla Stenberg	Nominated	
British Academy Children's Awards	November 25, 2012	Feature Film	Gary Ross, Nina Jacobson and Jon Kilik	Won	
British Academy Children's Awards	November 25, 2012	Feature Film Kids' Vote	The Hunger Games	Nominated	
CMT Music Awards	June 6, 2012	Collaborative Video of The Year	Safe & Sound	Nominated	
CMT Music Awards	June 6, 2012	Video of the Year	Safe & Sound	Nominated	
Costume Designers Guild Awards	February 19, 2013	Excellence in Fantasy Film	Judianna Makovsky	Nominated	
Critics' Choice Awards	January 10, 2013	Best Actress in an Action Movie	Jennifer Lawrence	Won	
Do Something! Awards	August 21, 2012	Movie Star: Male	Josh Hutcherson	Won	
Do Something! Awards	August 21, 2012	Movie Star: Male	Liam Hemsworth	Nominated	
Empire Awards	March 24, 2013	Best Actress	Jennifer Lawrence	Won	
Golden Globe Awards	January 13, 2013	Best Original Song	"Safe & Sound" (Taylor Swift, Joy Williams, John Paul White and T-Bone Burnett)	Nominated	
Grammy Awards	February 10, 2013	Best Song Written for Visual Media	"Safe & Sound" (Taylor Swift, Joy Williams, John Paul White and T-Bone Burnett)	Won	
Grammy Awards	February 10, 2013	Best Song Written for Visual Media	"Abraham's Daughter" (T Bone Burnett, Win Butler and Régine Chassagne)	Nominated	
Hugo Awards	September 1, 2013	Best Dramatic Presentation, Long Form	Screenplay by Gary Ross & Suzanne Collins, Directed by Gary Ross	Nominated	
Kerrang! Awards	June 7, 2012	Best Film	The Hunger Games	Won	
Kids' Choice Awards	March 23, 2013	Favorite Movie	The Hunger Games	Won	
Kids' Choice Awards	March 23, 2013	Favorite Movie Actress	Jennifer Lawrence	Nominated	
Kids' Choice Awards	March 23, 2013	Favorite Female Buttkicker	Jennifer Lawrence	Nominated	
MTV Movie Awards	June 3, 2012	Movie of the Year	The Hunger Games	Nominated	
MTV Movie Awards	June 3, 2012	Best Cast	Jennifer Lawrence, Josh Hutcherson, Liam Hemsworth, Elizabeth Banks, Alexander Ludwig, Woody Harrelson and Lenny Kravitz	Nominated	
MTV Movie Awards	June 3, 2012	Best Male Performance	Josh Hutcherson	Won	
MTV Movie Awards	June 3, 2012	Best Female Performance	Jennifer Lawrence	Won	
MTV Movie Awards	June 3, 2012	Best Fight	Jennifer Lawrence & Josh Hutcherson vs. Alexander Ludwig	Won	
MTV Movie Awards	June 3, 2012	Best Hero	Jennifer Lawrence	Nominated	
MTV Movie Awards	June 3, 2012	Best Kiss	Jennifer Lawrence and Josh Hutcherson	Nominated	
MTV Movie Awards	June 3, 2012	Best On-Screen Transformation	Elizabeth Banks	Won	
MTV Movie Awards	June 3, 2012	Breakthrough Performance	Liam Hemsworth	Nominated	
NAACP Image Awards	February 1, 2013	Outstanding Supporting Actor in a Motion Picture	Lenny Kravitz	Nominated	
NAACP Image Awards	February 1, 2013	Outstanding Supporting Actress in a Motion Picture	Amandla Stenberg	Nominated	
Nebula Awards	May 18, 2013	Ray Bradbury Award for Outstanding Dramatic Presentation	The Hunger Games	Nominated	
NewNowNext Awards	April 11, 2012	Next Mega Star	Josh Hutcherson	Won	
People's Choice Awards	January 9, 2013	Favorite Movie	The Hunger Games	Won	
People's Choice Awards	January 9, 2013	Favorite Action Movie	The Hunger Games	Won	
People's Choice Awards	January 9, 2013	Favorite Movie Franchise	The Hunger Games	Won	
People's Choice Awards	January 9, 2013	Favorite Face of Heroism	Jennifer Lawrence	Won	
People's Choice Awards	January 9, 2013	Favorite Movie Actress	Jennifer Lawrence	Won	
People's Choice Awards	January 9, 2013	Favorite On-Screen Chemistry	Jennifer Lawrence, Josh Hutcherson and Liam Hemsworth	Won	
People's Choice Awards	January 9, 2013	Favorite Movie Fan Following	Tributes	Nominated	
Saturn Awards	June 26, 2013	Best Science Fiction Film	The Hunger Games	Nominated	
Saturn Awards	June 26, 2013	Best Actress	Jennifer Lawrence	Won	
Society of Operating Cameramen Awards	March 9, 2013	Camera Operator of the Year in Feature Film	Duane Manwiller	Nominated	
Teen Choice Awards	July 22, 2012	Choice Sci-Fi/Fantasy Movie	The Hunger Games	Won	
Teen Choice Awards	July 22, 2012	Choice Sci-Fi/Fantasy Movie Actor	Josh Hutcherson	Won	
Teen Choice Awards	July 22, 2012	Choice Sci-Fi/Fantasy Movie Actress	Jennifer Lawrence	Won	
Teen Choice Awards	July 22, 2012	Choice Male Hottie	Liam Hemsworth	Won	
Teen Choice Awards	July 22, 2012	Choice Movie Chemistry	Jennifer Lawrence & Amandla Stenberg	Won	
Teen Choice Awards	July 22, 2012	Choice Movie Liplock	Jennifer Lawrence & Josh Hutcherson	Won	
Teen Choice Awards	July 22, 2012	Choice Movie Scene Stealer: Male	Liam Hemsworth	Won	
Teen Choice Awards	July 22, 2012	Choice Movie Scene Stealer: Female	Elizabeth Banks	Nominated	
Teen Choice Awards	July 22, 2012	Choice Movie Villain	Alexander Ludwig	Won	

== The Hunger Games: Catching Fire ==
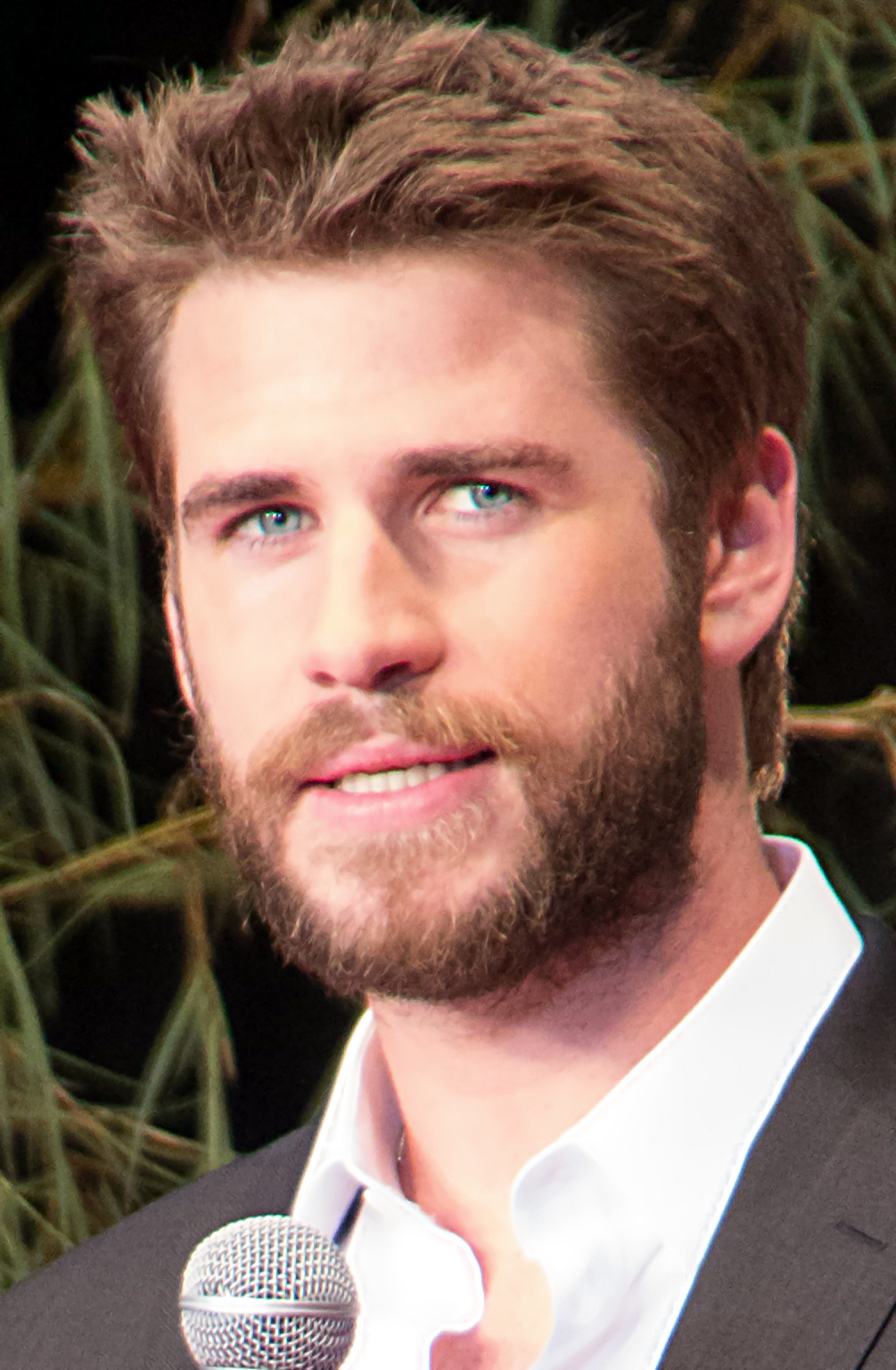
Liam Hemsworth portrays Gale Hawthorne.

The Hunger Games: Catching Fire was released on November 22, 2013, in the United States. The plot takes place a few months after the previous installment; Katniss Everdeen has now returned home safely after winning the 74th Annual Hunger Games along with fellow tribute Peeta Mellark. Throughout the story, Katniss senses that a rebellion against the oppressive Capitol is simmering through the districts.

Catching Fire also received a total of fifty nominations, winning sixteen times. The film was nominated for the Critics' Choice Awards for Best Action Film and a Saturn Award for Best Science Fiction Film. It won the MTV Movie Award for Best Movie and the Empire Award for Best Film and Best Thriller. For her performance, Lawrence was nominated a second time for the Empire Award for Best Actress as well as the Saturn Award and Critics' Choice Award. The song "Atlas" was also nominated for the Grammy Award for Best Song Written for Visual Media and a Golden Globe Award for Best Original Song, and won a Hollywood Film Award for Best Song.

Award	Date of ceremony	Category	Recipients	Result	Ref.
Costume Designers Guild Awards	February 22, 2014	Excellence in Fantasy Film	Trish Summerville	Won	
Critics' Choice Awards	January 16, 2014	Best Action Movie	The Hunger Games: Catching Fire	Nominated	
Critics' Choice Awards	January 16, 2014	Best Actress in an Action Movie	Jennifer Lawrence	Nominated	
Critics' Choice Awards	January 16, 2014	Best Song	"Atlas" (Coldplay)	Nominated	
Denver Film Critics Society Awards	January 13, 2014	Best Original Song	"Atlas" (Coldplay)	Nominated	
Detroit Film Critics Society Awards	December 13, 2013	Best Supporting Actor	Stanley Tucci	Nominated	
Empire Awards	March 30, 2014	Best Film	The Hunger Games: Catching Fire	Nominated	
Empire Awards	March 30, 2014	Best Actress	Jennifer Lawrence	Nominated	
Empire Awards	March 30, 2014	Best Supporting Actor	Sam Claflin	Nominated	
Empire Awards	March 30, 2014	Best Sci-Fi/Fantasy	The Hunger Games: Catching Fire	Nominated	
Empire Awards	March 30, 2014	Best Thriller	The Hunger Games: Catching Fire	Won	
Golden Globe Awards	January 12, 2014	Best Original Song	"Atlas" (Coldplay)	Nominated	
Grammy Awards	January 26, 2014	Best Song Written for Visual Media	"Atlas" (Coldplay)	Nominated	
Hollywood Film Awards	October 18–20, 2013	Best Song	"Atlas" (Coldplay)	Won	
Hugo Awards	August 17, 2014	Best Dramatic Presentation, Long Form	The Hunger Games: Catching Fire	Nominated	
London Film Critics' Circle	February 2, 2014	Technical Achievement	Trish Summerville	Nominated	
Kids' Choice Awards	March 29, 2014	Favorite Movie	The Hunger Games: Catching Fire	Won	
Kids' Choice Awards	March 29, 2014	Favorite Movie Actress	Jennifer Lawrence	Won	
Kids' Choice Awards	March 29, 2014	Favorite Female Buttkicker	Jennifer Lawrence	Won	
Kids' Choice Awards	March 29, 2014	Favorite Female Buttkicker	Jena Malone	Nominated	
MTV Movie Awards	April 14, 2013	Movie of the Year	The Hunger Games: Catching Fire	Won	
MTV Movie Awards	April 14, 2013	Best Male Performance	Josh Hutcherson	Won	
MTV Movie Awards	April 14, 2013	Best Female Performance	Jennifer Lawrence	Won	
MTV Movie Awards	April 14, 2013	Best Shirtless Performance	Sam Claflin	Nominated	
MTV Movie Awards	April 14, 2013	Best Fight	Jennifer Lawrence, Josh Hutcherson & Sam Claflin vs. Mutant Monkeys	Nominated	
MTV Movie Awards	April 14, 2013	Best Villain	Donald Sutherland	Nominated	
MTV Movie Awards	April 14, 2013	Favorite Character	Jennifer Lawrence	Nominated	
MTV Movie Awards	April 14, 2013	Best On-Screen Transformation	Elizabeth Banks	Nominated	
MTV Movie Awards	April 14, 2013	Breakthrough Performance	Liam Hemsworth	Nominated	
Nebula Awards	May 17, 2014	Ray Bradbury Award for Outstanding Dramatic Presentation	The Hunger Games: Catching Fire	Nominated	
People's Choice Awards	January 8, 2014	Favorite Year End Movie	The Hunger Games: Catching Fire	Won	
San Diego Film Critics Society Awards	December 11, 2013	Best Supporting Actress	Elizabeth Banks	Nominated	
San Diego Film Critics Society Awards	December 11, 2013	Best Editing	Alan Edward Bell	Nominated	
Saturn Awards	June 26, 2014	Best Science Fiction Film	The Hunger Games: Catching Fire	Nominated	
Saturn Awards	June 26, 2014	Best Director	Francis Lawrence	Nominated	
Saturn Awards	June 26, 2014	Best Actress	Jennifer Lawrence	Nominated	
Saturn Awards	June 26, 2014	Best Supporting Actress	Jena Malone	Nominated	
Saturn Awards	June 26, 2014	Best Production Design	Philip Messina	Nominated	
Saturn Awards	June 26, 2014	Best Editing	Alan Edward Bell	Nominated	
Saturn Awards	June 26, 2014	Best Costume	Trish Summerville	Won	
Teen Choice Awards	August 10, 2014	Choice Movie: Sci-Fi/Fantasy	The Hunger Games: Catching Fire	Won	
Teen Choice Awards	August 10, 2014	Choice Movie Actor: Sci-Fi/Fantasy	Josh Hutcherson	Won	
Teen Choice Awards	August 10, 2014	Choice Movie Actor: Sci-Fi/Fantasy	Liam Hemsworth	Nominated	
Teen Choice Awards	August 10, 2014	Choice Movie Actress: Sci-Fi/Fantasy	Jennifer Lawrence	Won	
Teen Choice Awards	August 10, 2014	Choice Movie: Liplock	Jennifer Lawrence & Josh Hutcherson	Nominated	
Teen Choice Awards	August 10, 2014	Choice Movie: Scene Stealer	Sam Claflin	Nominated	
Teen Choice Awards	August 10, 2014	Choice Movie: Villain	Donald Sutherland	Won	
Young Hollywood Awards	July 28, 2014	Best Threesome	Jennifer Lawrence, Liam Hemsworth and Josh Hutcherson	Nominated	
Young Hollywood Awards	July 28, 2014	Best Cast Chemistry–Film	The Hunger Games: Catching Fire	Nominated	
Young Hollywood Awards	July 28, 2014	Favorite Flick	The Hunger Games: Catching Fire	Nominated	

== The Hunger Games: Mockingjay – Part 1 ==
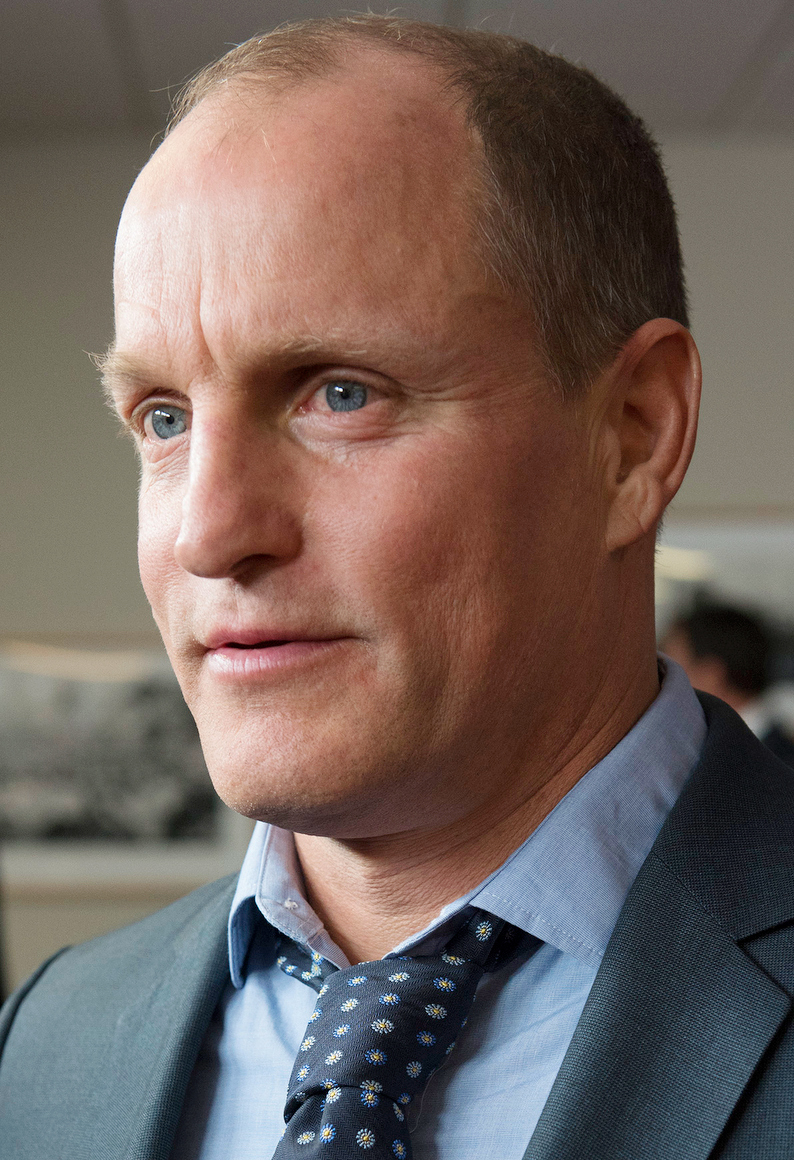
Woody Harrelson portrays Haymitch Abernathy.

The Hunger Games: Mockingjay – Part 1 is the first part of a two-part sequel, released on November 21, 2014, in the United States. The story continues to follow Katniss Everdeen; having twice survived the Hunger Games, Katniss finds herself in District 13. Under the leadership of President Coin (Julianne Moore) and the advice of her trusted friends, Katniss reluctantly becomes the symbol of a mass rebellion against the Capitol and fights to save Peeta and a nation moved by her courage.

Part 1 received twenty-seven nominations, with ten wins. It is the lowest-rated Hunger Games film of the franchise according to review aggregator Rotten Tomatoes. The film garnered a nomination for Best Science Fiction Film at the 41st Saturn Awards and its third consecutive nomination for the MTV Movie Awards for Best Movie. For her performance, Lawrence received a nomination for Best Actress in an Action Movie at the 20th Critics' Choice Awards and a Saturn Award nomination. The song "Yellow Flicker Beat" also received a nomination for Best Original Song at the 72nd Golden Globe Awards and Critics' Choice Awards. Meanwhile, Banks won for the second a MTV Movie Award for Best On-Screen Transformation.

Award	Date of ceremony	Category	Recipients	Result	Ref.
Alliance of Women Film Journalists	January 12, 2015	Kick Ass Award for Best Female Action Star	Jennifer Lawrence	Nominated	
Black Reel Awards	February 19, 2015	Best Breakthrough Performance	Patina Miller	Nominated	
Costume Designers Guild Awards	February 17, 2015	Excellence in Fantasy Film	Kurt & Bart	Nominated	
Critics' Choice Awards	January 15, 2015	Best Actress in an Action Movie	Jennifer Lawrence	Nominated	
Critics' Choice Awards	January 15, 2015	Best Song	"Yellow Flicker Beat" (Lorde)	Nominated	
Golden Globe Awards	January 11, 2015	Best Original Song	"Yellow Flicker Beat" (Lorde)	Nominated	
Kids' Choice Awards	March 28, 2015	Favorite Movie	The Hunger Games: Mockingjay – Part 1	Won	
Kids' Choice Awards	March 28, 2015	Favorite Male Action Star	Liam Hemsworth	Won	
Kids' Choice Awards	March 28, 2015	Favorite Female Action Star	Jennifer Lawrence	Won	
Kids' Choice Awards	March 28, 2015	Favorite Villain	Donald Sutherland	Nominated	
MTV Movie Awards	June 3, 2012	Movie of the Year	The Hunger Games: Mockingjay – Part 1	Nominated	
MTV Movie Awards	June 3, 2012	Best Female Performance	Jennifer Lawrence	Nominated	
MTV Movie Awards	June 3, 2012	Best Hero	Jennifer Lawrence	Nominated	
MTV Movie Awards	June 3, 2012	Best Musical Moment	Jennifer Lawrence	Won	
MTV Movie Awards	June 3, 2012	Best On-Screen Transformation	Elizabeth Banks	Won	
NewNowNext Awards	December 7, 2014	Best New Lead Film Actress	Natalie Dormer	Won	
Saturn Awards	June 25, 2015	Best Science Fiction Film	The Hunger Games: Mockingjay – Part 1	Nominated	
Saturn Awards	June 25, 2015	Best Actress	Jennifer Lawrence	Nominated	
Teen Choice Awards	August 16, 2015	Choice Movie: Sci-Fi/Fantasy	The Hunger Games: Mockingjay – Part 1	Won	
Teen Choice Awards	August 16, 2015	Choice Movie Actor: Sci-Fi/Fantasy	Josh Hutcherson	Won	
Teen Choice Awards	August 16, 2015	Choice Movie Actor: Sci-Fi/Fantasy	Liam Hemsworth	Nominated	
Teen Choice Awards	August 16, 2015	Choice Movie Actress: Sci-Fi/Fantasy	Jennifer Lawrence	Won	
Teen Choice Awards	August 16, 2015	Choice Movie: Liplock	Jennifer Lawrence and Liam Hemsworth	Nominated	
Teen Choice Awards	August 16, 2015	Choice Movie: Villain	Donald Sutherland	Nominated	
Women Film Critics Circle Awards	December 19, 2014	Best Female Images in a Movie	The Hunger Games: Mockingjay – Part 1	Won	

== The Hunger Games: Mockingjay – Part 2 ==
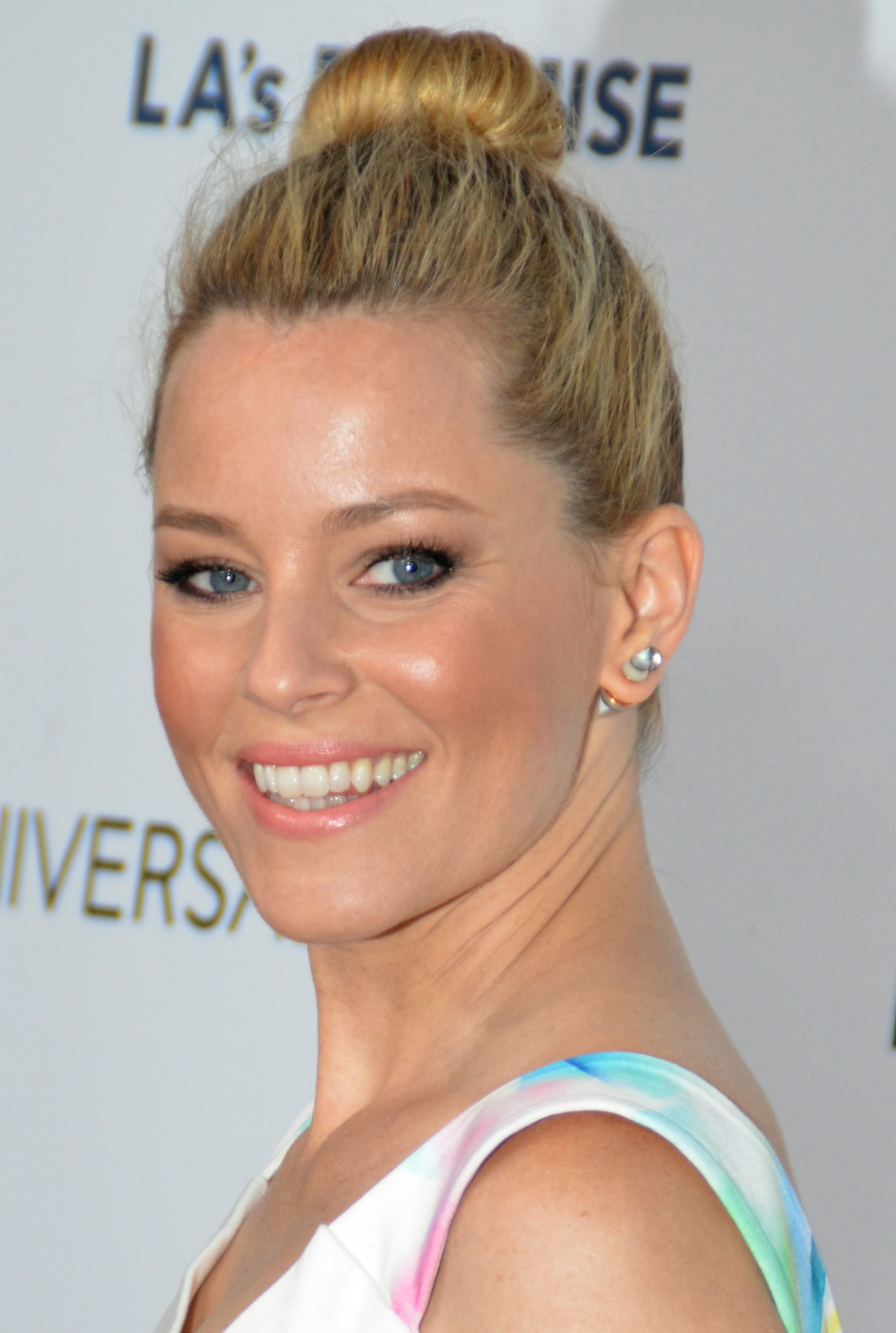
Elizabeth Banks portrays Effie Trinket.

The Hunger Games: Mockingjay – Part 2 is the fourth installment in The Hunger Games film series, and the second of two films, released on November 20, 2015, in the United States. The story continues with Katniss Everdeen, as she prepares to win the war against President Snow (Donald Sutherland) and the tyrannical Capitol. Together with Peeta, Gale, Finnick (Sam Claflin), and others, she travels to the Capitol to kill Snow. However, President Coin, the leader of District 13 and the rebellion, hides a bigger agenda that could not only jeopardize Katniss' life, but the future of Panem.

Part 2 has received 17 nominations, winning five, winning three 2nd place prizes and one 3rd place prize.

Award	Date of ceremony	Category	Recipients	Result	Ref.
Alliance of Women Film Journalists	January 12, 2016	Best Female Action Star	Jennifer Lawrence	Nominated	
CLIO Key Art Awards	October 22, 2015	Theatrical: Audio/Visual Creative Content – Short Form	The Hunger Games: Mockingjay Part 2	Silver	
CLIO Key Art Awards	October 22, 2015	Theatrical: Audio/Visual Technique Motion Graphics	The Hunger Games: Mockingjay Part 2	Won	
CLIO Key Art Awards	October 22, 2015	Theatrical: Print Domestic One-Sheet	The Hunger Games: Mockingjay Part 2	Silver	
CLIO Key Art Awards	October 22, 2015	Theatrical: Print Motion Poster	The Hunger Games: Mockingjay Part 2 (Bird Logo Motion Poster)	Silver	
CLIO Key Art Awards	October 22, 2015	Theatrical: Print Motion Poster	The Hunger Games: Mockingjay Part 2 (The Revolution Is About All Of Us)	Bronze	
Costume Designers Guild Awards	February 23, 2016	Excellence in Fantasy Film	Kurt & Bart	Nominated	
Critics' Choice Awards	January 17, 2016	Best Actress in an Action Movie	Jennifer Lawrence	Nominated	
Empire Awards	March 20, 2016	Best Sci-Fi / Fantasy	The Hunger Games: Mockingjay – Part 2	Nominated	
Empire Awards	March 20, 2016	Best Production Design	The Hunger Games: Mockingjay – Part 2	Nominated	
Empire Awards	March 20, 2016	Best Actress	Jennifer Lawrence	Nominated	
Georgia Film Critics Association	January 8, 2016	Oglethorpe Award for Excellence in Georgia Cinema	Francis Lawrence, Peter Craig, Danny Strong	Nominated	
Golden Trailer Awards	May 4, 2016	Best Fantasy Adventure Trailer	The Hunger Games: Mockingjay Part 2	Nominated	
Golden Trailer Awards	May 4, 2016	Best Motion/Title Graphics	The Hunger Games: Mockingjay Part 2	Nominated	
Golden Trailer Awards	May 4, 2016	Best Fantasy Adventure TV Spot	The Hunger Games: Mockingjay Part 2	Won	
Golden Trailer Awards	May 4, 2016	Best Music TV Spot	The Hunger Games: Mockingjay Part 2	Nominated	
Golden Trailer Awards	May 4, 2016	Best Action Poster & Best Fantasy/Adventure Poster	The Hunger Games: Mockingjay Part 2	Won	
Golden Trailer Awards	May 4, 2016	Best Billboard	The Hunger Games: Mockingjay Part 2	Nominated	
Golden Trailer Awards	May 4, 2016	Most Original Poster	The Hunger Games: Mockingjay Part 2	Nominated	
Golden Trailer Awards	May 4, 2016	Best Action Poster	The Hunger Games: Mockingjay Part 2	Nominated	
Kids' Choice Awards	March 12, 2016	Favorite Movie	The Hunger Games: Mockingjay – Part 2	Nominated	
Kids' Choice Awards	March 12, 2016	Favorite Movie Actress	Jennifer Lawrence	Won	
Make-Up Artists and Hair Stylists Guild	February 20, 2016	Feature Motion Picture – Best Special Make-up Effects	Ve Neill, Glenn Hetrick	Nominated	
MTV Movie Awards	April 10, 2016	Ensemble Cast	The cast of The Hunger Games: Mockingjay – Part 2	Nominated	
MTV Movie Awards	April 10, 2016	Best Action Performance	Jennifer Lawrence	Nominated	
MTV Movie Awards	April 10, 2016	Best Hero	Jennifer Lawrence	Won	
Saturn Awards	June 22, 2016	Best Fantasy Film Release	The Hunger Games: Mockingjay - Part 2	Nominated	

== The Hunger Games: The Ballad of Songbirds & Snakes ==
The Hunger Games: The Ballad of Songbirds & Snakes is the first prequel and fifth installment in The Hunger Games film series, released on November 17, 2023, in the United States. The plot take place 64 years before the events of the first film, its plot follows the events that lead a young Coriolanus Snow (Tom Blyth) on the path to becoming the tyrannical leader of Panem, including his relationship with the Hunger Games District 12 tribute Lucy Gray Baird (Rachel Zegler) during the 10th Hunger Games.

The Ballad of Songbirds & Snakes has received twenty nominations, winning four.

Award	Date of ceremony	Category	Recipients	Result	Ref.
Alliance of Women Film Journalists	January 4, 2024	EDA Special Mention Awards	The Hunger Games: The Ballad of Songbirds & Snakes	Nominated	
Artios Awards	March 7, 2024	The Zeitgeist Award	Debra Zane, Dylan Jury and Simone Bär (Location Casting)	Nominated	
Costume Designers Guild Awards	February 21, 2024	Excellence in Sci-Fi/Fantasy Film	Trish Summerville	Nominated	
Costume Designers Guild Awards	February 21, 2024	Excellence in Costume Illustration	Oksana Nedavniaya	Nominated	
Hollywood Music in Media Awards	November 15, 2023	Original Score – Sci-Fi/Fantasy Film	James Newton Howard	Nominated	
Hollywood Music in Media Awards	November 15, 2023	Original Song – Sci-Fi/Fantasy Film	"Can't Catch Me Now" - Olivia Rodrigo and Dan Nigro	Won	
North Carolina Film Critics Association	January 3, 2024	Best Original Song	"Can't Catch Me Now" - Olivia Rodrigo and Dan Nigro	Nominated	
North Carolina Film Critics Association	January 3, 2024	Ken Hanke Memorial Tar Heel Award	Hunter Schafer	Nominated	
People's Choice Awards	February 18, 2024	Action Movie of the Year	The Hunger Games: The Ballad of Songbirds & Snakes	Won	
People's Choice Awards	February 18, 2024	Female Movie Star of the Year	Viola Davis	Nominated	
People's Choice Awards	February 18, 2024	Female Movie Star of the Year	Rachel Zegler	Nominated	
People's Choice Awards	February 18, 2024	Action Movie Star of the Year	Viola Davis	Nominated	
People's Choice Awards	February 18, 2024	Action Movie Star of the Year	Rachel Zegler	Won	
Saturn Awards	February 2, 2025	Best Science Fiction Film	The Hunger Games: The Ballad of Songbirds & Snakes	Nominated	
Saturn Awards	February 2, 2025	Best Actor in a Film	Tom Blyth	Nominated	
Saturn Awards	February 2, 2025	Best Younger Actor in a Film	Rachel Zegler	Nominated	
Saturn Awards	February 2, 2025	Best Film Music	James Newton Howard	Nominated	
Saturn Awards	February 2, 2025	Best Film Costume Design	Trish Summerville	Nominated	
Set Decorators Society of America Awards	February 13, 2024	Best Achievement in Décor/Design of a Science Fiction or Fantasy Feature Film	Sabine Schaaf and Uli Hanisch	Nominated	
Society of Composers & Lyricists Awards	February 13, 2024	Outstanding Original Song for a Dramatic or Documentary Visual Media Production	"Can't Catch Me Now" - Olivia Rodrigo and Dan Nigro	Won	
