= Teen Choice Award for Choice Movie Actor – Sci-Fi/Fantasy =

Entertainment award category

The following is a list of Teen Choice Award winners and nominees for Choice Sci-Fi/Fantasy Movie Actor. Sometimes it is awarded as two separate categories: Choice Sci-Fi Movie Actor and Choice Fantasy Movie Actor.

== Winners/Nominees ==
Year	Actor	Role(s)	Film	Ref.
2010	Choice Movie Actor – Sci-Fi			
2010	Sam Worthington	Jake Sully	Avatar	
2010	Sharlto Copley	Wikus van de Merwe	District 9	
2010	John Cusack	Jackson Curtis	2012	
2010	Robert Downey Jr.	Tony Stark / Iron Man	Iron Man 2	
2010	Jude Law	Remy	Repo Men	
2010	Choice Movie Actor – Fantasy			
2010	Taylor Lautner	Jacob Black	The Twilight Saga: New Moon	
2010	Johnny Depp	Tarrant Hightopp / Mad Hatter	Alice in Wonderland	
2010	Jake Gyllenhaal	Dastan	Prince of Persia: The Sands of Time	
2010	Robert Pattinson	Edward Cullen	The Twilight Saga: New Moon	
2010	Sam Worthington	Perseus	Clash of the Titans	
2011	Taylor Lautner	Jacob Black	The Twilight Saga: Eclipse	
2011	Johnny Depp	Captain Jack Sparrow	Pirates of the Caribbean: On Stranger Tides	
2011	Robert Pattinson	Edward Cullen	The Twilight Saga: Eclipse	
2011	Daniel Radcliffe	Harry Potter	Harry Potter and the Deathly Hallows – Part 1	
2011	Ryan Reynolds	Hal Jordan / Green Lantern	Green Lantern	
2012	Josh Hutcherson	Peeta Mellark	The Hunger Games	
2012	Robert Downey Jr.	Tony Stark / Iron Man	The Avengers	
2012	Chris Hemsworth	Thor	The Avengers	
2012	Taylor Lautner	Jacob Black	The Twilight Saga: Breaking Dawn – Part 1	
2012	Robert Pattinson	Edward Cullen	The Twilight Saga: Breaking Dawn – Part 1	
2013	Taylor Lautner	Jacob Black	The Twilight Saga: Breaking Dawn – Part 2	
2013	Tom Cruise	Commander Jack Harper	Oblivion	
2013	Robert Downey Jr.	Tony Stark / Iron Man	Iron Man 3	
2013	James Franco	Oscar Diggs	Oz the Great and Powerful	
2013	Robert Pattinson	Edward Cullen	The Twilight Saga: Breaking Dawn – Part 2	
2014	Josh Hutcherson	Peeta Mellark	The Hunger Games: Catching Fire	
2014	Chris Evans	Steve Rogers / Captain America	Captain America: The Winter Soldier	
2014	Andrew Garfield	Peter Parker / Spider-Man	The Amazing Spider-Man 2	
2014	Chris Hemsworth	Thor	Thor: The Dark World	
2014	Liam Hemsworth	Gale Hawthorne	The Hunger Games: Catching Fire	
2015	Josh Hutcherson	Peeta Mellark	The Hunger Games: Mockingjay – Part 1	
2015	George Clooney	Frank Walker	Tomorrowland	
2015	Robert Downey Jr.	Tony Stark / Iron Man	Avengers: Age of Ultron	
2015	Chris Hemsworth	Thor	Avengers: Age of Ultron	
2015	Liam Hemsworth	Gale Hawthorne	The Hunger Games: Mockingjay – Part 1	
2015	Channing Tatum	Caine Wise	Jupiter Ascending	
2016	Chris Evans	Steve Rogers / Captain America	Captain America: Civil War	
2016	Ben Affleck	Bruce Wayne / Batman	Batman v Superman: Dawn of Justice	
2016	Henry Cavill	Clark Kent / Superman	Batman v Superman: Dawn of Justice	
2016	Robert Downey Jr.	Tony Stark / Iron Man	Captain America: Civil War	
2016	Chris Hemsworth	Eric the Huntsman	The Huntsman: Winter's War	
2016	Josh Hutcherson	Peeta Mellark	The Hunger Games: Mockingjay – Part 2	
2017	Choice Movie Actor – Sci-Fi			
2017	Chris Pratt	Peter Quill / Star-Lord	Guardians of the Galaxy Vol. 2	
2017	Asa Butterfield	Gardner Elliot	The Space Between Us	
2017	Tom Hiddleston	James Conrad	Kong: Skull Island	
2017	Diego Luna	Cassian Andor	Rogue One: A Star Wars Story	
2017	Dacre Montgomery	Jason Scott / Red Ranger	Power Rangers	
2017	Jeremy Renner	Ian Donnelly	Arrival	
2017	Choice Movie Actor – Fantasy			
2017	Dwayne Johnson	Maui (voice)	Moana	
2017	Asa Butterfield	Jacob "Jake" Portman	Miss Peregrine's Home for Peculiar Children	
2017	Benedict Cumberbatch	Dr. Stephen Strange	Doctor Strange	
2017	Eddie Redmayne	Newt Scamander	Fantastic Beasts and Where to Find Them	
2017	Dan Stevens	Beast	Beauty and the Beast	
2018	Choice Movie Actor – Sci-Fi			
2018	Chris Hemsworth	Thor	Thor: Ragnarok	
2018	Chadwick Boseman	T'Challa / Black Panther	Black Panther	
2018	Ryan Gosling	K	Blade Runner 2049	
2018	Dwayne Johnson	Davis Okoye	Rampage	
2018	Mark Ruffalo	Bruce Banner / Hulk	Thor: Ragnarok	
2018	Tye Sheridan	Wade Watts / Parzival	Ready Player One	
2018	Choice Movie Actor – Fantasy			
2018	Anthony Gonzalez	Miguel Rivera (voice)	Coco	
2018	John Boyega	Finn	Star Wars: The Last Jedi	
2018	James Corden	Peter Rabbit (voice)	Peter Rabbit	
2018	Gael García Bernal	Héctor Rivera (voice)	Coco	
2018	Mark Hamill	Luke Skywalker	Star Wars: The Last Jedi	
2018	Oscar Isaac	Poe Dameron	Star Wars: The Last Jedi	
2019	Will Smith	Genie	Aladdin	
2019	Zachary Levi	Billy Batson / Shazam	Shazam!	
2019	Mena Massoud	Aladdin	Aladdin	
2019	James McAvoy	Charles Xavier / Professor X	Dark Phoenix	
2019	Lin-Manuel Miranda	Jack	Mary Poppins Returns	
2019	Jason Momoa	Arthur Curry / Aquaman	Aquaman	
