= The Hunger Games: Mockingjay – Part 1 =

2014 film by Francis Lawrence

- Theatrical release poster
- Directed by: Francis Lawrence
- Screenplay by: Peter Craig; Danny Strong
- Adaptation by: Suzanne Collins
- Based on: Mockingjay by Suzanne Collins
- Produced by: Nina Jacobson; Jon Kilik
- Starring: Jennifer Lawrence; Josh Hutcherson; Liam Hemsworth; Woody Harrelson; Elizabeth Banks; Julianne Moore; Philip Seymour Hoffman; Jeffrey Wright; Stanley Tucci; Donald Sutherland
- Cinematography: Jo Willems
- Edited by: Alan Edward Bell; Mark Yoshikawa
- Music by: James Newton Howard
- Production companies: Lionsgate; Color Force
- Distributed by: Lionsgate
- Release dates: November 10, 2014 (Odeon Leicester Square); November 21, 2014 (United States)
- Running time: 123 minutes
- Country: United States
- Language: English
- Budget: $125–140 million
- Box office: $766.6 million

The Hunger Games: Mockingjay – Part 1 is a 2014 American dystopian film directed by Francis Lawrence from a screenplay by Peter Craig and Danny Strong. The first of two cinematic parts based on the 2010 novel Mockingjay by Suzanne Collins, it is the sequel to The Hunger Games: Catching Fire (2013) and the third installment of The Hunger Games film series. The film stars Jennifer Lawrence, Josh Hutcherson, Liam Hemsworth, Woody Harrelson, Elizabeth Banks, Julianne Moore, Philip Seymour Hoffman, Jeffrey Wright, Stanley Tucci, Donald Sutherland and Sam Claflin. In the film, Katniss Everdeen (Lawrence) joins Alma Coin (Moore), the renegade leader of the underground District 13, in a mass rebellion against the Capitol.

Development on a third Hunger Games film was announced in May 2012, after Lionsgate announced Collins's novel would be split into two parts. Lawrence was confirmed to return to direct the final two installments that November, which would be filmed back-to-back. Most of the main cast was rounded out by September 2013 when principal photography began, lasting until June 2014, with filming locations including Boston, Atlanta, Los Angeles, Paris, and Berlin. The film faced controversy after its content was used in political protests in 2014 and 2015.

The Hunger Games: Mockingjay – Part 1 premiered at the Odeon Leicester Square in London on November 10, 2014, and was released in the United States on November 21, by Lionsgate. The film received generally positive reviews from critics, with praise for its acting, music, and political subtext, but criticism of its pacing and the decision to split the novel into two films. It grossed $766.6 million worldwide, becoming the fifth-highest-grossing film of 2014; it set the record for the largest opening day and opening weekend of 2014.

Among its accolades, Mockingjay – Part 1 was nominated for Best Science Fiction Film at the 41st Saturn Awards, while Lawrence was nominated Best Actress in an Action Movie at the 20th Critics' Choice Awards. The song "Yellow Flicker Beat" by Lorde, the lead single from its soundtrack, was nominated for Best Original Song at the 72nd Golden Globe Awards and Critics' Choice Awards. Part 2 was released in November 2015.

== Plot ==
After being rescued from the destroyed arena in the 75th Hunger Games, (Note: As depicted in The Hunger Games: Catching Fire (2013)) Katniss Everdeen, Beetee, and Finnick Odair are taken to District 13, an underground district isolated from Panem that has been spearheading the rebellion. Katniss is introduced to President Alma Coin, the rebel leader. Katniss is told that her arrow destroying the forcefield led to riots in over half the districts, joining District 13 in the rebellion, which caused President Snow to bomb District 12 in retaliation. Coin asks her to become the "Mockingjay"—a symbol of the rebellion—as part of a "hearts and minds" strategy. She visits the ruins of District 12, her old house somehow untouched with white roses from President Snow inside. Katniss is reunited with her mother and sister Prim and reluctantly agrees to become Mockingjay after seeing Peeta being manipulated on state television to quell the rebellion.

Katniss meets her film team and is given Effie Trinket as a stylist and her close friend Gale as a bodyguard. They travel to District 8 where Katniss is filmed being saluted by dozens of wounded civilians at a hospital; Snow, seeing the footage, orders an airstrike at the hospital, killing everyone inside. The crew films Katniss and Gale shooting down two Capitol hovercraft and Katniss' rage-filled threatening speech, inspiring loggers in District 7 to revolt against the Capitol.

Katniss and her team travel to District 12 to film her singing "The Hanging Tree". Rebel forces in District 5, singing the same anthem, launch an attack against a hydroelectric dam, the Capitol's primary source of electricity. The attack successfully implodes and breaches the dam, causing a blackout throughout the Capitol. That night, Katniss watches Peeta being interviewed by Caesar Flickerman, the Games' former presenter, when Coin and Beetee hijack the signal to air a clip of Katniss. After seeing it, Peeta suddenly shouts a warning that the Capitol is about to attack District 13. Coin orders a mass evacuation further into underground shelters, and the facility survives the attack. Upon emerging, Katniss discovers the area littered with white roses; she concludes that Snow orchestrated this to inform her that whenever she condemns the Capitol, they will torture Peeta in retaliation.

Coin dispatches a strike team to rescue Peeta and the remaining victors Johanna Mason, Enobaria and Annie Cresta from their prison. Beetee hijacks the Capitol's defense system with a "propo" narrated by Finnick to convince more districts to side with the rebellion in which Finnick reveals that Snow would force "desirable" tributes (including Finnick himself) into prostitution with the threat of killing their families if they refused (which happened to Johanna), and that Snow only became the leader of Panem because he poisoned his opponents. When the propo proves not to be enough, Katniss communicates directly with Snow to buy enough time. Gale's team rescues the victors and escapes the Capitol easily, indicating the Capitol reduced its security on purpose. When Katniss greets Peeta, he unexpectedly attacks and nearly strangles her to death before being knocked out by Boggs.

Katniss wakes up and is informed that Peeta has been "hijacked" — brainwashed into trying to kill her, which explains why the Capitol allowed them to escape with him. Peeta is placed in solitary confinement, while a serum is developed to reverse the hijacking effects. Coin announces that the rebels' next objective is the Capitol's principal military stronghold in District 2, the only district remaining loyal to the Capitol.

== Cast ==
- Jennifer Lawrence as Katniss Everdeen
- Josh Hutcherson as Peeta Mellark
- Liam Hemsworth as Gale Hawthorne
- Woody Harrelson as Haymitch Abernathy
- Elizabeth Banks as Effie Trinket
- Julianne Moore as President Alma Coin
- Philip Seymour Hoffman as Plutarch Heavensbee
- Jeffrey Wright as Beetee Latier
- Stanley Tucci as Caesar Flickerman
- Donald Sutherland as President Coriolanus Snow
- Willow Shields as Primrose Everdeen
- Paula Malcomson as Mrs. Everdeen
- Sam Claflin as Finnick Odair
- Jena Malone as Johanna Mason
- Stef Dawson as Annie Cresta
- Mahershala Ali as Boggs
- Natalie Dormer as Cressida
- Evan Ross as Messalla
- Wes Chatham as Castor
- Elden Henson as Pollux
- Patina Miller as Commander Paylor
- Robert Knepper as Antonius
- Sarita Choudhury as Egeria

== Production ==
=== Pre-production ===
On July 10, 2012, Lionsgate announced that the third and final installment in the series, Mockingjay, would be split into two parts. The Hunger Games: Mockingjay – Part 1 was released on November 21, 2014, and The Hunger Games: Mockingjay – Part 2 was released on November 20, 2015. Many directors, including Rian Johnson, Francis Lawrence and Alfonso Cuarón were considered for the job. On November 1, 2012, Lawrence, director of Catching Fire, announced he would return to direct both final parts in the series.

On December 6, 2012, Danny Strong announced that he would be writing the third and fourth films. On February 15, 2013, Lionsgate confirmed the script for Part 1 was written by Strong, giving him permission to write Part 2. Later in August, Hemsworth confirmed that shooting of the film would begin in September 2013.

The film's production began on September 16, 2013, in Boston, Atlanta, and Los Angeles. Studio Babelsberg co-produced and oversaw production services for the film.

=== Casting ===
On August 26, 2013, it was announced that actress Stef Dawson had joined the cast and would portray Annie Cresta. Lionsgate announced on September 13, 2013, that Julianne Moore had joined the cast of both Mockingjay's parts to play President Alma Coin. Over the next month, Patina Miller, Mahershala Ali, Wes Chatham, and Elden Henson joined the cast as Commander Paylor, Boggs, Castor, and Pollux, respectively. There was a casting call for extras on September 23. Robert Knepper was cast as Antonius, a character who does not appear in the books and is an addition to the adaptation. Knepper has stated that during his audition he knew that the lines he received were not what he would end up doing, adding that "they [Lionsgate] are so secretive about this." Wyatt Russell was originally offered a role in both parts of Mockingjay, but his father Kurt confirmed in September 2013 that he turned down the offer to star in 22 Jump Street.

=== Filming ===
Shooting began on September 23, 2013, in Atlanta and concluded on June 20, 2014, in Berlin. Part 1 was filmed back-to-back with Part 2. In mid-October, the crews were spotted filming in Rockmart. The crew and cast took a break to promote The Hunger Games: Catching Fire and filming resumed on December 2, 2013. On December 14, 2013, shooting took place at the Marriott Marquis in Atlanta, Georgia. On December 18, shooting began at Caldwell Tanks in Newnan, Georgia.

Philip Seymour Hoffman died on February 2, 2014. Lionsgate released a statement stating that Hoffman had completed filming most of his scenes prior to his death. A dedication to him appears ahead of the closing credits.

On April 18, 2014, producer Nina Jacobson announced that filming in Atlanta had just wrapped up, followed by director Francis Lawrence announcing the next day about moving production to Europe. It was announced that they would be filming battle scenes in Paris and at Berlin Tempelhof Airport in Berlin. They began filming in the streets of Paris and in the city of Ivry-sur-Seine on May 7, where Lawrence and Hemsworth were spotted during the filming of some scenes among extras.

On May 9, it was reported that filming was taking place in Noisy le Grand, Paris where Lawrence, Hemsworth, Hutcherson, and Claflin were spotted on the set which re-created the world of Panem. It is the same location where Brazil was filmed in 1984.

=== Costumes ===
Christian Cordella, a costume illustrator on the first movie, returned to sketch the outfits for District 13.

== Music ==
The music was created to convey the dark feel of the film. On October 9, 2014, it was revealed that the Trinity School boys' choir recorded tracks for the score, written by James Newton Howard. Jennifer Lawrence performed the film's version of the song "The Hanging Tree", originally featured in the novel, but was not thrilled about having to sing and cried the day of the performance. As of the evening of November 25, 2014, the song was #4 on the Apple's iTunes top 150 list. "The Hanging Tree" also peaked at #1 in Austria and Hungary and peaked at #12 on Billboard Hot 100 in the US.

== Marketing ==
Tim Palen, the head of marketing for Lionsgate said, "When we started, we decided to look at this as one big movie that's eight hours long. Otherwise, it's going to be kind of overwhelming to do a new campaign for each movie." He also added that he saw the biggest potential in international growth and that they matched Iron Man 3 domestically, but were aiming to improve internationally for the two Mockingjay films. He revealed in an interview with Variety that there would be reveals of the marketing campaign at the Cannes Film Festival in May and San Diego Comic-Con in July.

On May 14, 2014 TheHungerGamesExclusive.com was launched. It featured three stills from the movie, featuring Woody Harrelson, Julianne Moore, Philip Seymour Hoffman and Jeffrey Wright with an additional behind-the-scenes still of director Francis Lawrence and Mahershala Ali. The website also featured other content, including a short GIF image of Julianne Moore as President Coin and a video interview with Moore. There was also an in-depth interview with director Francis Lawrence, producer Nina Jacobson and screenwriter Peter Craig. A page from the script of Part 1 was also released in addition to a motion poster, with the tagline, "Fire burns brighter in the darkness."

On May 17, 2014, while principal photography was underway in Paris, some of the cast and crew including Lawrence, Hutcherson, Hemsworth, Claflin, Moore, Sutherland, Lawrence, and Jacobson attended the 2014 Cannes Film Festival for a photo shoot and party bash to excite international investors. Co-chairman of Lionsgate Rob Friedman said in response to why they would incur such big expense even though the film isn't actually playing at the festival that it was convenient as the cast were in Europe already and that "it's a big opportunity for our international distributors to actually hear what the worldwide plans are for the film, which opens in November. Cannes is the best publicity opportunity from an international penetration perspective."

Kabam announced their partnership with Lionsgate to create a mobile game based on The Hunger Games: Mockingjay Part 1, to tie in with the film's release. Kabam produced an exclusive role playing, card collection mobile game. In the game, players assume the identity of District members sent on a mission in order to build their alliance, liberate their District, and rebuild Panem. "Lionsgate has an unparalleled track record of developing and producing blockbuster movie franchises like The Hunger Games," said Kabam Chief Operating Officer Kent Wakeford. "Partnering with Lionsgate, Kabam will build a mobile game that's as much fun to play as the movie is to watch. The game will be developed in Kabam's China studio, the same place where the hit film-based game The Hobbit: The Battle of the Five Armies was created and went on to generate more than $100 million in revenue during its first year."

The film was not listed on the schedule for San Diego Comic-Con in 2014, which raised questions on their absence by fans and the press. Lionsgate announced on July 18, 2014, a week before the event, that the film would have a presence at the convention. Lionsgate partnered up with Samsung to debut the (including the viral videos which were considered 'teasers', third) teaser trailer on Samsung's new Galaxy Tab S at a special event on Friday, July 25, which was being hosted off-site at the Hard Rock Hotel. The partnership allowed Samsung users to view the trailer before the online release, download the first two movies for free as well as be given a free complimentary ticket to the movie. On July 28, the teaser trailer officially debuted online through the movie's official Facebook page and YouTube account. Within minutes, #MockingjayTeaserTrailerToday, #OurLeadertheMockingjay, and #OfficialTeaserTrailer became trending topics worldwide on Twitter. A full worldwide official trailer was released on September 15.

=== Viral marketing ===
The District 12 Heroes poster, representing the district's industry of mining as part of 'The Capitol' viral marketing campaign.

A viral marketing campaign began on June 21, 2014, with the return of TheCapitol.PN

On June 25, TheCapitol.PN viral site released a video titled "President Snow's Address - 'Together As One' " featuring a speech by Donald Sutherland, in character as President Snow addressing the citizens of Panem and warning them that if they fight the system, they will be the ones to face the repercussions. The video also briefly features Josh Hutcherson, in character as Peeta Mellark, who at the final events of the previous film was taken hostage by the Capitol. The video went viral on YouTube becoming the most watched trailer during the last week of June in the US while trending as the most "Popular Video on YouTube" in Australia and Canada. The video, billed as a teaser trailer, was attached to screenings of Transformers: Age of Extinction beginning June 28.

Two weeks later on July 9, Capitol TV released a second viral video titled 'President Snow's Address — Unity' featuring again another speech by President Snow with Peeta Mellark standing beside him, but this time accompanied by Jena Malone in character as Johanna Mason, who was also captured by the Capitol at the end of the previous film, and a group of peacekeepers. The speech was interrupted by Jeffrey Wright, in character as Beetee Latier, a technician from District 13, to announce that "the Mockingjay lives." Within minutes, #TheMockingjayLives and '#2 - Unity' became the top two trending topics worldwide on Twitter. The video, billed as the second teaser trailer for the film, was played with screenings of Dawn of the Planet of the Apes.

On July 24, shortly before the trailer's official release, a teaser poster for the movie was posted on The Capitol's Instagram account, but was quickly deleted. Shortly after the removal of the poster, the account issued an apology "[for the] technical issues", presenting the poster's posting as a hack from the District 13 rebellions.

On August 6, after few clues given on the official Facebook page, www.district13.co.in was launched. The website introduced new posters for the District 13 characters including Beetee, Coin, Plutarch, Finnick, Haymitch and Effie.

== Political ramifications ==
On November 20, 2014, some showings were reportedly canceled in Thailand because protestors were using the three-finger salute at demonstrations against the country's military government.

On November 24, 2014, it was reported that in relation to the Ferguson unrest following the shooting of Michael Brown, a protester had scrawled graffiti reading "If we burn, you burn with us" on an arch in St. Louis, Missouri.

On September 11, 2015, some Catalan pro-independence protesters used the three-finger salute at the Free Way to the Catalan Republic against Spain's government.

== Release ==
The Hunger Games: Mockingjay – Part 1 was released on November 19, 2014 in nine countries including France(Les Espaces d'Abraxas), Greece, Scandinavia and Brazil, and then expanded to a further fifty-nine on November 20, 2014, including the UK, Germany, Australia, Italy, Mexico and South Korea. With seventeen more released on November 21, 2014, including the United States, the total launch was in eighty-five markets, making it the biggest release of the year and Lionsgate's widest ever release. This was surpassed by its sequel across eighty-seven markets in 2015. The film was released in China on February 8, 2015, in 2D and 3D, making it the first film in the franchise to be released in 3D in any country, debuted in more than 4,000 screens. Director Francis Lawrence stated: "we recently saw the 3-D version of Mockingjay – Part 1 before its release in China, and the new level of immersion was really fantastic." The film was dedicated to the memory of Philip Seymour Hoffman.

=== Home video ===
The Hunger Games: Mockingjay – Part 1 was released on Digital HD on February 17, 2015, and was followed by a Blu-ray/DVD release on March 6, 2015. It topped the home video sales chart for two consecutive weeks despite facing competition from Night at the Museum: Secret of the Tomb. The film's home video sales earned a $73.1 million with 4.5 million copies sold, making it the fifth best-selling title of 2015. The entire Hunger Games series was released on 4K UHD Blu-Ray on November 8, 2016.

== Reception ==
=== Box office ===
The Hunger Games: Mockingjay – Part 1 grossed $337.1 million in the US and Canada, and $418.2 million in other countries, for a worldwide total of $755.4 million against $125 million budget ($190 million including promotion and advertising costs). Calculating in all expenses, Deadline Hollywood estimated that the film made a profit of $211.61 million. Worldwide, it is the fifth-highest-grossing film of 2014. Its worldwide opening of $273.8 million is the sixteenth-largest of all time, the second-largest opening of 2014 behind Transformers: Age of Extinction ($302.1 million), and the largest among The Hunger Games franchise.

==== North America ====
In the US and Canada, the film was released across 3,200 theaters on Thursday night, November 20, 2014, and was widened to 4,151 theaters on Friday, November 21, 2014. The film earned $17 million from Thursday night previews which is the biggest of 2014 but was lower than its two predecessors. It earned $55 million in its opening day which is the largest opening day of 2014 and the sixth-largest in November but nevertheless still lower than its predecessors. It is the fifteenth film to debut on Friday with $50 million or more, and the nineteenth film to earn $50 million or more in a single day. The film topped the box office in its opening weekend with $121.9 million, and became the biggest opening of 2014 surpassing the $100 million record of Transformers: Age of Extinction as well as becoming the fifteenth-largest, the 28th film to debut atop with over $100 million, and the only franchise to have three films earn over $100 million in a weekend. Its opening weekend is also the sixth-largest of November. Its opening weekend gross was still relatively lower than the openings of The Hunger Games ($152 million) and Catching Fire ($158 million). In its second weekend the film remained at the summit earning $56.9 million and set a record for the third-highest 5-day Thanksgiving gross with $82.6 million behind The Hunger Games: Catching Fire ($109.9 million) and Frozen ($93.6 million) and the fifth-highest 3-day Thanksgiving gross with $56.9 million. The film topped the box office for three consecutive weekends before being overtaken by Exodus: Gods and Kings in its fourth weekend. The film passed the $300 million mark in its 6th weekend (37 days later) and became the second film of 2014 to earn over $300 million at the box office after Guardians of the Galaxy. On Wednesday, January 21, 2015, sixty-one days after its initial release, the film surpassed Guardians of the Galaxy and became the highest-grossing film of 2014 in North America until it was surpassed by American Sniper in the next two months.

It earned $337.1 million at the North American box office making it the third-highest-grossing film in The Hunger Games franchise, the second-highest-grossing film of 2014 (behind American Sniper), the fourth-highest-grossing science fiction film based on a book, the fourth-highest-grossing young-adult adaptation. and the 36th-highest-grossing film in North America. It is also the first film to cross the $300 million mark without 3D or IMAX since Indiana Jones and the Kingdom of the Crystal Skull (2008), and also the highest-grossing non-3D, non IMAX film since Pirates of the Caribbean: Dead Man's Chest (2006).

==== Outside North America ====
Outside North America, Mockingjay – Part 1 was also released on the same day in 85 other markets, with the notable exceptions of China, Japan, and India, making it the widest release of any film in 2014. The film earned over $33 million in two days (Wednesday–Thursday) and $67.5 million in three days (Wednesday–Friday) from 17,000 screens. In its opening weekend overseas, the film earned $154.3 million from 17,963 screens in 85 markets which is 4% higher than Catching Fire. The film remained at number one in its second and third weekend overseas earning $67 million and $32.9 million, respectively. In its fourth weekend, the film fell to number two as a result of being overtaken by The Hobbit: The Battle of the Five Armies.

The film's top openings occurred in the UK, Ireland and Malta ($19.9 million), Germany ($13.7 million), Mexico ($12.1 million), Russia and the CIS ($11.1 million), France ($10.5 million), Australia ($10.1 million), Brazil ($8.8 million) and India ($5.1 million). The film also grossed $3.9 million in the Philippines. In China, where the film was released over two and a half months later—on February 8, 2015, it had a strong opening day with $9.87 million and went on to earn $31.4 million through its opening week, which is more than what Catching Fire earned through its entire run. The film had an unsuccessful opening in Japan with $500,000 debuting at eighth place at the Japanese box office and ended up making a mere $1.6 million after its run.

It became the highest-grossing Hunger Games film of all time in 31 countries including Brazil, Italy, Chile, Venezuela, Central America, and Portugal.

=== Critical response ===
The Hunger Games: Mockingjay – Part 1 received generally positive reviews from critics, with praise for its political subtext and acting performances (particularly that of Lawrence), but criticism for its lack of action and the makers' splitting the source material for two separate adaptations. Review aggregation website Rotten Tomatoes reported a 70% approval rating, based on 302 reviews, with an average score of 6.3/10. The site's consensus reads: "The Hunger Games: Mockingjay – Part 1 sets up the franchise finale with a penultimate chapter loaded with solid performances and smart political subtext, though it comes up short on the action front." The film holds a Metacritic score of 64 out of 100, based on 46 critics, indicating "generally favorable reviews". Audiences surveyed by CinemaScore gave the film an "A−" grade, indicating positive reactions from paying viewers.

Cath Clarke of Time Out gave the film four out of five. She praised the politics as "tensely gripping" and felt it had a lot to say about the "ethical ambiguities of war". She praised Lawrence's performance as "strong, smart, stubborn, angry and full of heart" and noted it had grown "deeper and darker". Kevin Harley, who reviewed the film for Total Film, also awarded the film four out of five. He felt the film held up due to Lawrence's performance and solid supporting cast. He praised the action scenes and diverse story-telling. He concluded that the film was "gutsy" and managed to successfully divide the novel into a film "less on scraps than strategy" and "less on action than debates", although he noted that this threatened to "distance viewers".

Robbie Collin awarded the film three out of five. In his review for The Telegraph, he praised the film for being "intense, stylish, topical, well-acted" and declared that it "remains one of the most fascinating, vividly realised fantasy landscapes in recent cinema". Despite praising Lawrence and Hoffman's performances, he felt that it was overcrowded with "two hours of preamble with no discernible payoff". He concluded that the film "fell short" and "could not be called satisfying". Henry Barnes of The Guardian also gave the film three out of five. He felt it offered "thrills" despite "lacking a solid structure" and featured "limp special effects". He was also critical of the "creaky script" and felt it lacked some of the "terror" of the previous installments, but praised Lawrence for her performance.

Todd McCarthy, who reviewed the film for The Hollywood Reporter, felt the installment was "disappointingly bland and unnecessarily protracted". He was critical of the leisurely pace and noted it felt "like a manufactured product through and through, ironic and sad given its revolutionary theme". Richard Corliss of Time felt the film was a placeholder for the second installment and noted "Lawrence isn't given much opportunity to do anything spectacularly right here."

In a 2023 interview with People magazine, director Francis Lawrence admitted that he regretted splitting Mockingjay into two parts. He said: "What I realized in retrospect — and after hearing all the reactions and feeling the kind of wrath of fans, critics and people at the split — is that I realized it was frustrating. And I can understand it. In an episode of television, if you have a cliffhanger, you have to wait a week or you could just binge it and then you can see the next episode. But making people wait a year, I think, came across as disingenuous, even though it wasn't. Our intentions were not to be disingenuous. In truth, we got more on the screen out of the book than we would've in any of the other movies because you're getting close to four hours of screen time for the final book. But, I see and understand how it frustrated people." Because of these reasons, Lawrence desisted from likewise splitting in two parts The Hunger Games: The Ballad of Songbirds & Snakes despite briefly considering the possibility due to the novel's length.

== Accolades ==
List of Awards and Nominations
Award	Category	Recipients	Results
Black Reel Awards	Outstanding Breakthrough Performance – Female	Patina Miller	Nominated
Broadcast Film Critics Association	Best Actress in Action Movie	Jennifer Lawrence	Nominated
Broadcast Film Critics Association	Best Song	"Yellow Flicker Beat" by Lorde	Nominated
Golden Globe Awards	Best Original Song – Motion Picture	"Yellow Flicker Beat" by Lorde	Nominated
Women Film Critics Circle	Best Female Images in Movies		Won
Kid's Choice Awards	Favorite Villain	Donald Sutherland	Nominated
Kid's Choice Awards	Favorite Movie	The Hunger Games: Mockingjay - Part 1	Won
Kid's Choice Awards	Favorite Male Action Star	Liam Hemsworth	Won
Kid's Choice Awards	Favorite Female Action Star	Jennifer Lawrence	Won
MTV Movie Awards	Movie of the Year	The Hunger Games: Mockingjay - Part 1	Nominated
MTV Movie Awards	Best Female Performance	Jennifer Lawrence	Nominated
MTV Movie Awards	Best Musical Moment	Jennifer Lawrence	Won
MTV Movie Awards	Best On-Screen Transformation	Elizabeth Banks	Won
MTV Movie Awards	Best Hero	Jennifer Lawrence	Nominated
Saturn Awards	Best Science Fiction Film	The Hunger Games: Mockingjay - Part 1	Nominated
Saturn Awards	Best Actress	Jennifer Lawrence	Nominated
Teen Choice Awards	Choice Movie: Sci-Fi/Fantasy		Won
Teen Choice Awards	Choice Movie Actor: Sci-Fi/Fantasy	Liam Hemsworth	Nominated
Teen Choice Awards	Choice Movie Actor: Sci-Fi/Fantasy	Josh Hutcherson	Won
Teen Choice Awards	Choice Movie Actress: Sci-Fi/Fantasy	Jennifer Lawrence	Won
Teen Choice Awards	Choice Movie: Villain	Donald Sutherland	Nominated
Teen Choice Awards	Choice Movie: Liplock	Jennifer Lawrence and Liam Hemsworth	Nominated

== Sequel ==
On July 10, 2012, Lionsgate announced that the second part of the Mockingjay adaptation was set for release on November 20, 2015, with Francis Lawrence again directing.
