= Teen Choice Award for Choice Movie – Sci-Fi/Fantasy =

Entertainment award category

The following is a list of Teen Choice Award winners and nominees for Choice Movie - Sci-Fi/Fantasy. Formally awarded as two separate categories in 2010: Choice Movie - Sci-Fi and Choice Movie - Fantasy.

== Winners and nominees ==
=== 2010s ===
Year	Winner	Nominees	Ref.
2010	Choice Movie – Sci-Fi		
2010	Avatar	2012; District 9; Iron Man 2; The Time Traveler's Wife	
2010	Choice Movie – Fantasy		
2010	The Twilight Saga: New Moon	Alice in Wonderland; Clash of the Titans; Harry Potter and the Half-Blood Prince; Prince of Persia: The Sands of Time	
2011	Harry Potter and the Deathly Hallows – Part 1	Pirates of the Caribbean: On Stranger Tides; Super 8; The Twilight Saga: Eclipse; X-Men: First Class	
2012	The Hunger Games	The Avengers; Mirror Mirror; The Twilight Saga: Breaking Dawn – Part 1; Wrath of the Titans	
2013	The Twilight Saga: Breaking Dawn – Part 2	Beautiful Creatures; Iron Man 3; Oblivion; Oz the Great and Powerful	
2014	The Hunger Games: Catching Fire	The Amazing Spider-Man 2; Captain America: The Winter Soldier; Thor: The Dark World; X-Men: Days of Future Past	
2015	The Hunger Games: Mockingjay – Part 1	Avengers: Age of Ultron; Cinderella; The Hobbit: The Battle of the Five Armies; Mad Max: Fury Road; Tomorrowland	
2016	Captain America: Civil War	Batman v Superman: Dawn of Justice; Fantastic Four; The Hunger Games: Mockingjay – Part 2; The Huntsman: Winter's War; Star Wars: The Force Awakens	
2017	Choice Movie – Sci-Fi		
2017	Guardians of the Galaxy Vol. 2	Arrival; Kong: Skull Island; Power Rangers; Rogue One: A Star Wars Story; The Space Between Us	
2017	Choice Movie – Fantasy		
2017	Beauty and the Beast	Doctor Strange; Fantastic Beasts and Where to Find Them; Miss Peregrine's Home for Peculiar Children; Moana	
2018	Choice Movie – Sci-Fi		
2018	Black Panther	Blade Runner 2049; Rampage; Ready Player One; Thor: Ragnarok	
2018	Choice Movie – Fantasy		
2018	Coco	Peter Rabbit; Star Wars: The Last Jedi; A Wrinkle in Time	
2019	Aladdin	Aquaman; Dark Phoenix; Fantastic Beasts: The Crimes of Grindelwald; Mary Poppins Returns; Shazam!	
