= Teen Choice Award for Choice Movie Actress – Sci-Fi/Fantasy =

Entertainment award category

The following is a list of Teen Choice Award winners and nominees for Choice Movie Actress – Sci-Fi/Fantasy. Formally awarded as two separate categories in 2010: Choice Movie Actress – Sci-Fi and Choice Movie Actress – Fantasy.

== Winners/Nominees ==
=== 2010s ===
Year	Winner	Nominees	Ref.
2010	Choice Movie Actress - Sci-Fi		
2010	Zoe Saldana – Avatar	Scarlett Johansson – Iron Man 2; Rachel McAdams – The Time Traveler's Wife; Gwyneth Paltrow – Iron Man 2; Amanda Peet – 2012	
2010	Choice Movie Actress - Fantasy		
2010	Kristen Stewart – The Twilight Saga: New Moon	Gemma Arterton – Prince of Persia: The Sands of Time and Clash of the Titans; Rosario Dawson – Percy Jackson & the Olympians: The Lightning Thief; Mia Wasikowska – Alice in Wonderland; Emma Watson – Harry Potter and the Half-Blood Prince	
2011	Emma Watson – Harry Potter and the Deathly Hallows – Part 1	Penélope Cruz – Pirates of the Caribbean: On Stranger Tides; Elle Fanning – Super 8; Blake Lively – Green Lantern; Kristen Stewart – The Twilight Saga: Eclipse	
2012	Jennifer Lawrence – The Hunger Games	Lily Collins – Mirror Mirror; Vanessa Hudgens – Journey 2: The Mysterious Island; Scarlett Johansson – The Avengers; Kristen Stewart – The Twilight Saga: Breaking Dawn – Part 1	
2013	Kristen Stewart – The Twilight Saga: Breaking Dawn – Part 2	Mila Kunis – Oz the Great and Powerful; Gwyneth Paltrow – Iron Man 3; Saoirse Ronan – The Host; Michelle Williams – Oz the Great and Powerful	
2014	Jennifer Lawrence – The Hunger Games: Catching Fire and X-Men: Days of Future Past	Halle Berry – X-Men: Days of Future Past; Scarlett Johansson – Captain America: The Winter Soldier; Natalie Portman – Thor: The Dark World; Emma Stone – The Amazing Spider-Man 2	
2015	Jennifer Lawrence – The Hunger Games: Mockingjay – Part 1	Mackenzie Foy – Interstellar; Lily James – Cinderella; Scarlett Johansson – Avengers: Age of Ultron; Mila Kunis – Jupiter Ascending; Britt Robertson - Tomorrowland	
2016	Jennifer Lawrence – The Hunger Games: Mockingjay – Part 2	Amy Adams – Batman v Superman: Dawn of Justice; Scarlett Johansson – Captain America: Civil War; Chloë Grace Moretz – The 5th Wave; Daisy Ridley – Star Wars: The Force Awakens; Charlize Theron – The Huntsman: Winter's War	
2017	Choice Sci-Fi Movie Actress		
2017	Zoe Saldaña – Guardians of the Galaxy Vol. 2	Amy Adams – Arrival; Becky G – Power Rangers; Felicity Jones – Rogue One: A Star Wars Story; Brie Larson – Kong: Skull Island; Naomi Scott – Power Rangers	—N/a
2017	Choice Fantasy Movie Actress		
2017	Emma Watson – Beauty and the Beast	Auliʻi Cravalho – Moana; Eva Green – Miss Peregrine's Home for Peculiar Children; Rachel McAdams – Doctor Strange; Katherine Waterston – Fantastic Beasts and Where to Find Them	—N/a
2018	Choice Sci-Fi Movie Actress		
2018	Letitia Wright – Black Panther	Olivia Cooke – Ready Player One; Danai Gurira – Black Panther; Naomie Harris – Rampage; Lupita Nyong'o – Black Panther; Tessa Thompson – Thor: Ragnarok	—N/a
2018	Choice Fantasy Movie Actress		
2018	Carrie Fisher (Note: Fisher's win is posthumous.) – Star Wars: The Last Jedi	Mindy Kaling – A Wrinkle in Time; Storm Reid – A Wrinkle in Time; Daisy Ridley – Star Wars: The Last Jedi; Oprah Winfrey – A Wrinkle in Time; Reese Witherspoon – A Wrinkle in Time	—N/a
2019	Naomi Scott – Aladdin	Emily Blunt – Mary Poppins Returns; Amber Heard – Aquaman; Keira Knightley – The Nutcracker and the Four Realms; Sophie Turner – Dark Phoenix; Katherine Waterston – Fantastic Beasts: The Crimes of Grindelwald	
