= Josh Hutcherson =

American actor (born 1992)

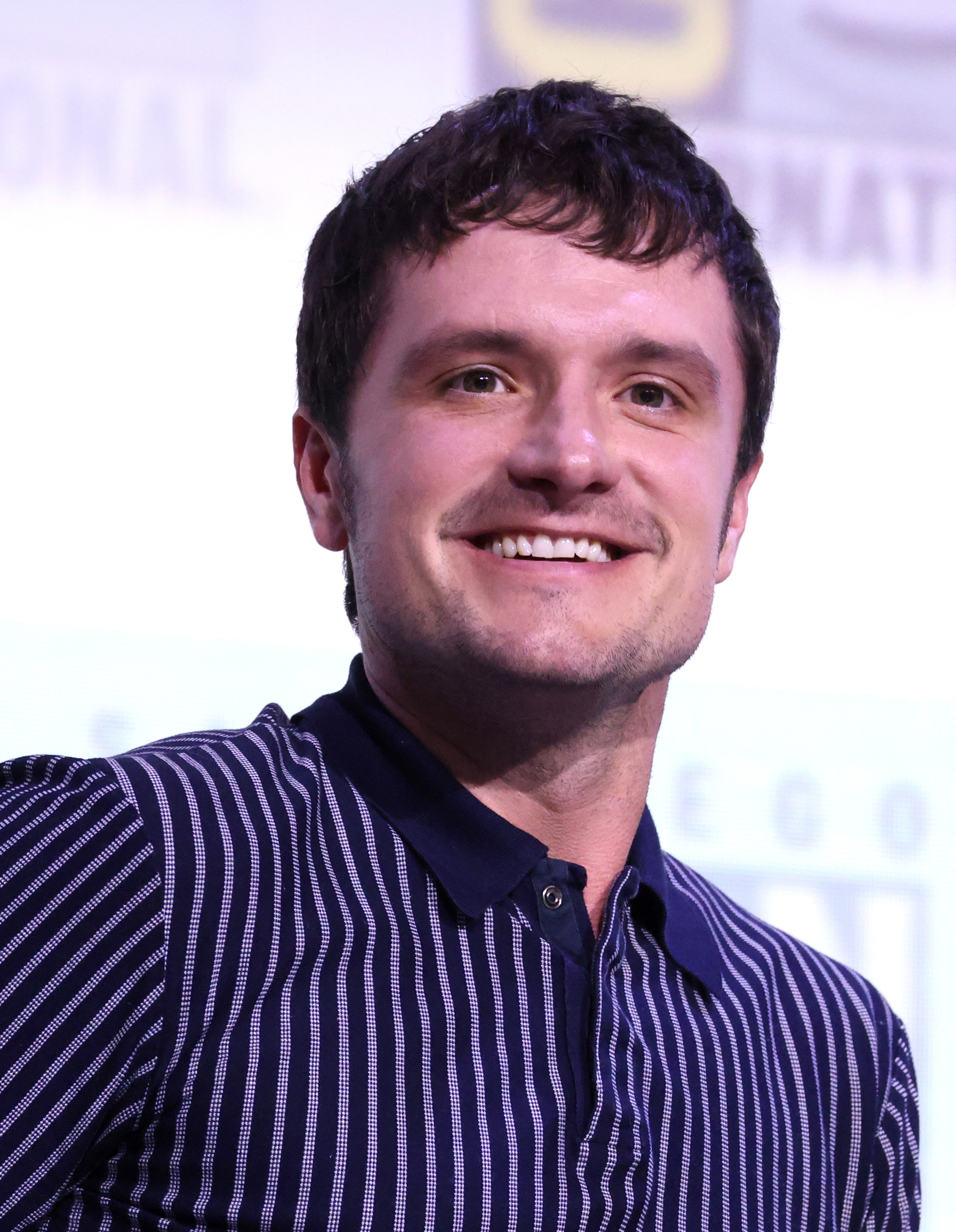
- Hutcherson at the 2025 San Diego Comic-Con
- Born: Joshua Ryan Hutcherson; October 12, 1992 (age 34); Union, Kentucky, U.S.
- Occupation: Actor
- Years active: 2002–present
- Partner: Claudia Traisac (2013–present)

Joshua Ryan Hutcherson (born October 12, 1992) is an American actor. His accolades include four Teen Choice Awards, four Young Artist Awards, and three MTV Movie Awards, in addition to a nomination for a Screen Actors Guild Award.

Hutcherson began acting in the early 2000s and appeared in several commercials and minor film and television roles before gaining prominence in his teenage years with main roles in Little Manhattan and Zathura: A Space Adventure (both 2005), RV (2006), Bridge to Terabithia (2007), Journey to the Center of the Earth (2008), and The Kids Are All Right (2010). In 2011, 18-year-old Hutcherson landed the leading role of Peeta Mellark in the top-grossing film series The Hunger Games, released yearly between 2012 and 2015, for which he won three MTV Movie Awards and a People's Choice Award. In the same period, he also played a lead role in Journey 2: The Mysterious Island (2012) and voice role in the animated film Epic (2013).

Hutcherson decreased his workload post-Hunger Games and appeared in several independent films, as well as in the television series Future Man (2017–2020) and Ultraman (2019–2023). He has since starred in the commercially successful horror films Five Nights at Freddy's (2023) and Five Nights at Freddy's 2 (2025) and the action film The Beekeeper (2024). Throughout his career, he has expressed an interest in filmmaking. He has served as an executive producer for Detention (2011), The Forger (2012), and Escobar: Paradise Lost (2015), while also playing a lead role in each film.

== Early life ==
Joshua Ryan Hutcherson was born on October 12, 1992, in Union, Kentucky. He is the elder son of Michelle (née Fightmaster), a former Delta Air Lines employee who now assists with Josh's career, and Chris Hutcherson, an analyst for the United States Environmental Protection Agency (EPA). His parents, who were also born and raised in Kentucky, met in high school in Dry Ridge. He has one younger brother, Connor (b. 1996).

Hutcherson's interest in acting developed as a child despite his parents' concerns about the profession. According to the actor himself, he had "loved the entertainment industry" from the age of four. His father said that his son was compelled to perform for people from a very young age, possessing a personality that attracted people's attention. His mother said that he "bugged us so much" into becoming an actor, but believed it was a phase he was going through and would grow out of. At age eight, Hutcherson went through the yellow pages and contacted an acting agency. In January 2002, he and his mother met acting coach Bob Luke, who travelled from New York City to Kentucky to meet them. Luke advised them to go to Los Angeles and begin auditioning Hutcherson for TV pilots. At the time, his only acting experience had been in a Kroger television commercial and a Vacation Bible School training film. For three years, Hutcherson and his mother lived in Los Angeles' Oakwood apartments, a housing community that accommodates young child actors and their families.

Most of Hutcherson's childhood was spent on film sets rather than in a classroom. He attended New Haven Elementary School in Union until he began his career at the age of nine, after which he began homeschooling, with his mother as his teacher. He later returned to Kentucky to attend Ryle High School for one semester. Hutcherson played on the high school's soccer team and has been a keen sports enthusiast since, also displaying a passion for football and tennis. At the age of 13, he participated in a triathlon. He later said of his schooling experiences, "I know it's something kids have to deal with every single day but getting up at the same time every day and having to listen to teachers talk about things I could learn so much more easily on my own, I hated it."

== Career ==
=== 2002–2004: Early roles ===
After moving to Hollywood in 2002, Hutcherson appeared in various television commercials. He landed his first major acting role as Nicky Harper in the 2002 pilot episode of House Blend, followed by minor roles in an episode of ER and the pilot episode of Becoming Glen. The following year, he played the leading role of Charlie Logan in the television film Miracle Dogs, which aired on Animal Planet. Later that year, he starred opposite Peter Falk and Tim Daly in the television film, Wilder Days, playing Falk's grandson who accompanies him on a turbulent road trip. Daly was impressed with the young Hutcherson, remarking, "He's an exceptional kid. He's a really good actor, and he's very smart and confident in himself." Hutcherson's next role was as a boy dressed as Robin in his first feature film appearance, the well-reviewed independent film American Splendor, which won the grand jury prize at the Sundance Film Festival. His character in 2004's fantasy film The Polar Express, young Hero Boy, was created by motion-capture of his facial expressions and body movements. The film starred Tom Hanks in the lead role and received mixed reviews from critics. In the animated fantasy film Howl's Moving Castle, he voiced the character of Markl, working alongside two other lead characters Christian Bale and Billy Crystal. All of his dialogue for the film was recorded in about eight consecutive hours.

=== 2005–2012: Child stardom ===
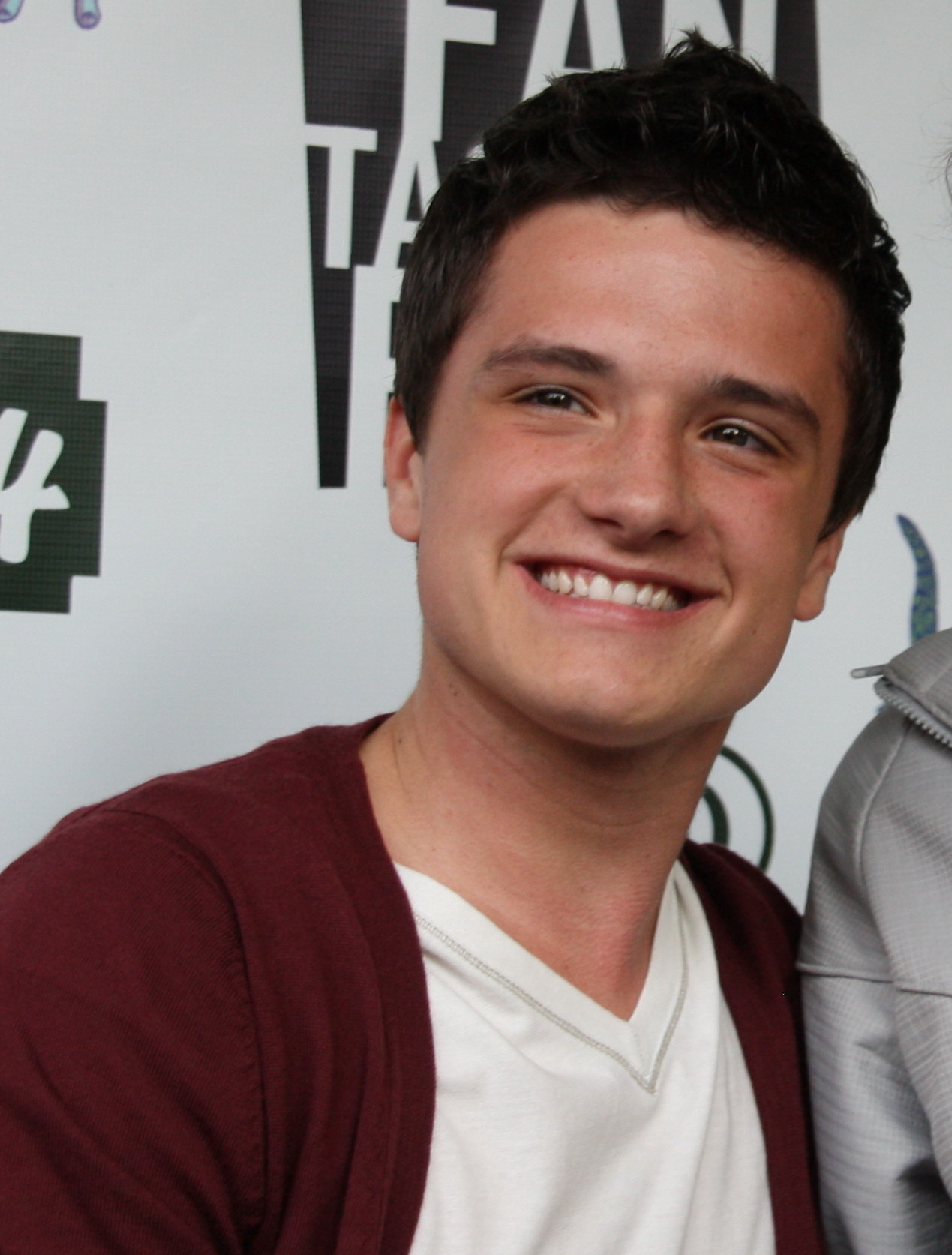
Hutcherson at the premiere of Cirque du Freak in 2009

In 2005, Hutcherson appeared in several Hollywood films while trying to establish himself in the industry. He portrayed the minor role of Bucky Weston in the comedy Kicking & Screaming. In 2005's Little Manhattan, he had a lead role alongside his younger brother, Connor. Stella Papamichael of the BBC approved of his performance, saying that "Hutcherson's delivery is spot-on, showing a keen instinct for self-effacing humor that would make even Woody Allen feel that bit more inadequate", but Variety columnist Brian Lowry felt that Hutcherson "might have looked cute on the page, but even with his Linus voice the language and tone [didn't] feel natural." He next appeared in a lead role in Jon Favreau's Zathura: A Space Adventure, which he enjoyed filming owing to the number of special effects and stunts he was involved with. Hutcherson received the Young Artist Award for "Best Performance in a Feature Film by a Leading Young Actor" for the film.

Hutcherson's next appearance was in the comedy RV in early 2006, playing the son of Robin Williams' character, Bob Munro. He professed finding it difficult to concentrate during the production because he was "constantly laughing" at Williams' jokes and antics between takes. The film was not received favorably by critics; Variety said the film suffered from "blunt predictability and meager laughs". He received his second Young Artist Award nomination for his role, but lost to Logan Lerman in Hoot.

Hutcherson's breakthrough role in his career as a child actor came in 2007, when he portrayed Jesse Aarons in the fantasy drama Bridge to Terabithia. The film was shot on location in New Zealand for three and a half months. Hutcherson said of the filming: "That was an amazing experience. It doesn't get any prettier than that. There were beaches everywhere and all sorts of forests. We took little road trips everywhere and just had a lot of fun." He admitted to not having read the novel that the film is based upon before being cast. Author Ann C. Paietta describes his character of Jesse Aarons as "an introverted boy with four sisters, a financially strapped family, and a real talent for drawing" whose life is turned around when Leslie Burke (AnnaSophia Robb) arrives, with whom he creates an imaginary utopian world. Anne Hornaday of The Washington Post found his casting to be "a perfect fit" and commended how he portrayed the "sensitive, artistic, temperament" of his character, while Miriam Di Nunzio of the Chicago Sun-Times noted the chemistry between Hutcherson and Robb, referring to them as a "dynamic duo". He won his second Young Artist Award for "Best Performance in a Feature Film by a Leading Young Actor" for the film. Hutcherson's next role was in Firehouse Dog (2007), in which he played Shane Fahey, a firefighter's son who befriends a dog. He has expressed his pleasure in working and bonding with the four different dogs who played his canine co-star. The film received mixed reviews, although critics were favorable to Hutcherson. Following the film, Carrie Rickey of The Philadelphia Inquirer referred to him as the "Jodie Foster of Generation Y", remarking that with "each successive film Hutcherson dives deeper into his reservoir of shame and hurt and hope, unnerving for one so young, but also unusually urgent for an actor of any age."

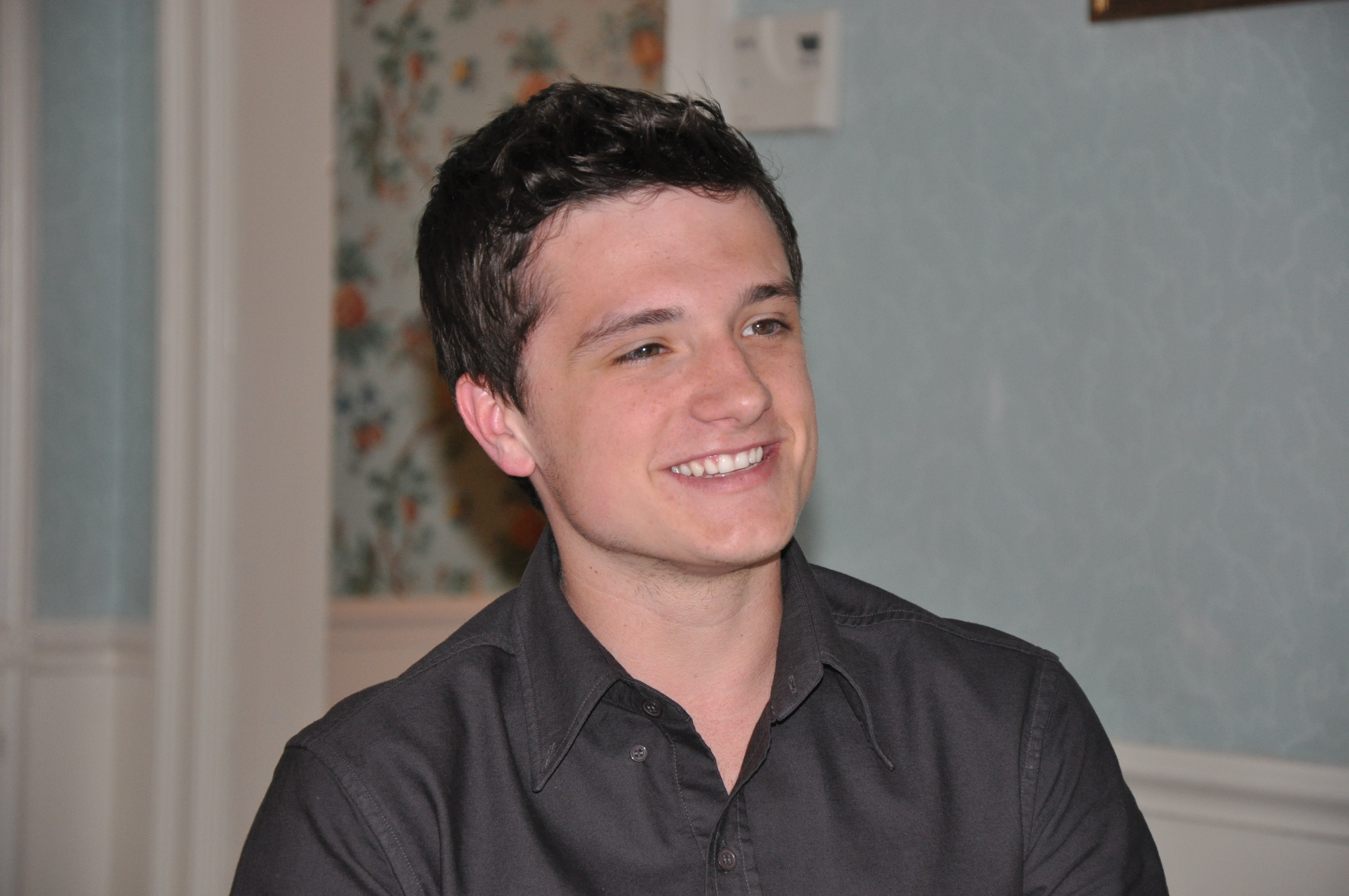
Hutcherson at the 2010 New York Film Festival

In 2008, he appeared in the independent crime drama Winged Creatures (released as Fragments on DVD) alongside Dakota Fanning as they portrayed two teenage friends who survive a massacre, and in Journey to the Center of the Earth, a 3D film adaptation of the novel of the same name where he portrayed a teen who travels to Iceland with an uncle he hardly knows, played by Brendan Fraser. Over the next two years, he appeared as a boy named Steve "Leopard" Leonard who visits a freak show with his friends in the vampire fiction film adaptation of the book Cirque du Freak and had a supporting role in the critically acclaimed The Kids Are All Right, portraying the son of a lesbian couple, played by Annette Bening and Julianne Moore. According to Kaleem Aftab of The Independent, his role in the film was a pivotal point in his career and one of vital importance to continuing his career into adulthood. Hutcherson expressed gratitude at being cast in the film, displaying satisfaction with the intimacy and creative freedom that independent films provide over studio films. The film won the Golden Globe Award for Best Motion Picture – Musical or Comedy in 2010, and was a nominee for Best Picture at the 83rd Academy Awards. Gregory Ellwood of entertainment site HitFix stated: "Hutcherson's charismatic wit and natural instincts shine and it's arguably the first film where he proves he's more than just another sharp-looking teen actor."

Between landing the role in The Hunger Games and the film's release, he played a lead role and served as an executive producer for two films: Detention (2011) and The Forger (2011). In Detention, he played the role of popular teenager Clapton Davis in a film the plot of which has been compared to 1985's The Breakfast Club. His role in The Forger was as a 15-year-old orphan who finds himself in trouble until Alfred Molina's character comes to his aid. The film was not well received but the actors' chemistry together and their performance was.

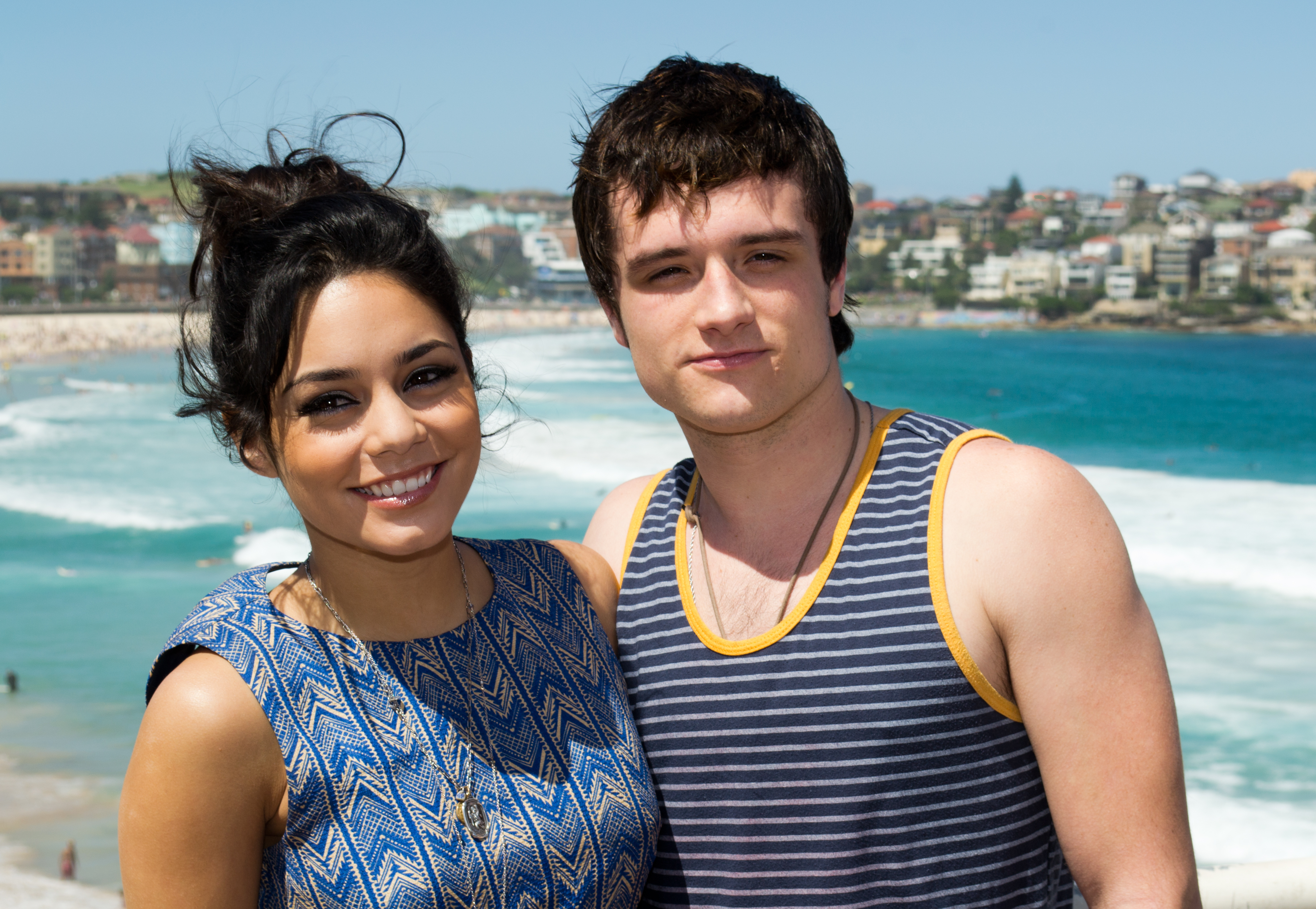
Hutcherson and Journey 2: The Mysterious Island co-star Vanessa Hudgens in Sydney in January 2012

In 2012, Hutcherson reprised his role as Sean Anderson in Journey to the Center of the Earth sequel, Journey 2: The Mysterious Island. Hutcherson has always been vocal about his desire to work on films of all sorts of genres. Although the film was largely panned, it fared well commercially and his performance was well received, with Kofi Outlaw of Screenrant.com appreciating how he "does a good job holding the screen and portraying a somewhat layered protagonist". He also co-starred in Red Dawn, a remake of the 1984 film of the same name that was shot in 2009 (when Hutcherson was 16) but delayed for several years due to distribution issues. The film was panned by critics, achieving only a 12 percent approval rating on Rotten Tomatoes, the lowest score of any film Hutcherson has acted in.

=== 2011–2015: Transition to young adult and The Hunger Games blockbuster success ===
That role is so key to have a boy that can use language. That's how Peeta navigates the world, that's his gift, and Josh was the only one who could bring that to life in such a real and natural way.

— Suzanne Collins, The Hunger Games series author

After losing out on the coveted role of Spider-Man in The Amazing Spider-Man (2012), Hutcherson was depressed. Hutcherson said: "I got told ‘no’ which, as a teenager, was heartbreaking because I obviously wanted to be Spider-Man. But then, I was cast in The Hunger Games. That was the craziest turn of events. Hunger Games came out of nowhere. It just changed everything." On April 4, 2011, Lionsgate announced that 18-year-old Hutcherson had been cast as Peeta Mellark in The Hunger Games series, opposite Jennifer Lawrence as Katniss Everdeen. He was eager to land the role, feeling that he related to the character extremely well. In preparation for filming, he had to bleach his hair and gain 15 pounds. Lawrence, a very close friend, has always spoken highly of him as an actor; in regards to his portrayal of Peeta Mellark she stated, "He's charming, he's sweet, he's down to earth, he's normal. He embodies all of it and brings it all to Peeta ... he's got all those great qualities and every single one of them comes across in every line he says out loud as Peeta." He became known for his pranks on set, leading to an accident as he was play-fighting with Lawrence who kicked him in the head, unintentionally knocking him unconscious and giving him a concussion. The initial film, The Hunger Games, was released on March 23, 2012, and went on to become one of the highest-grossing films of the year. Hutcherson received the MTV Movie Award for "Best Male Performance". He was also awarded the 2012 NewNowNext award for "Next Mega Star" and the National Association of Theatre Owners's 2012 CinemaCon award for "Breakthrough Performer of the Year". Peter Travers of Rolling Stone described the actor's portrayal saying, "[Hutcherson] brings humor and a bruised heart to a boy who needs to mature fast."

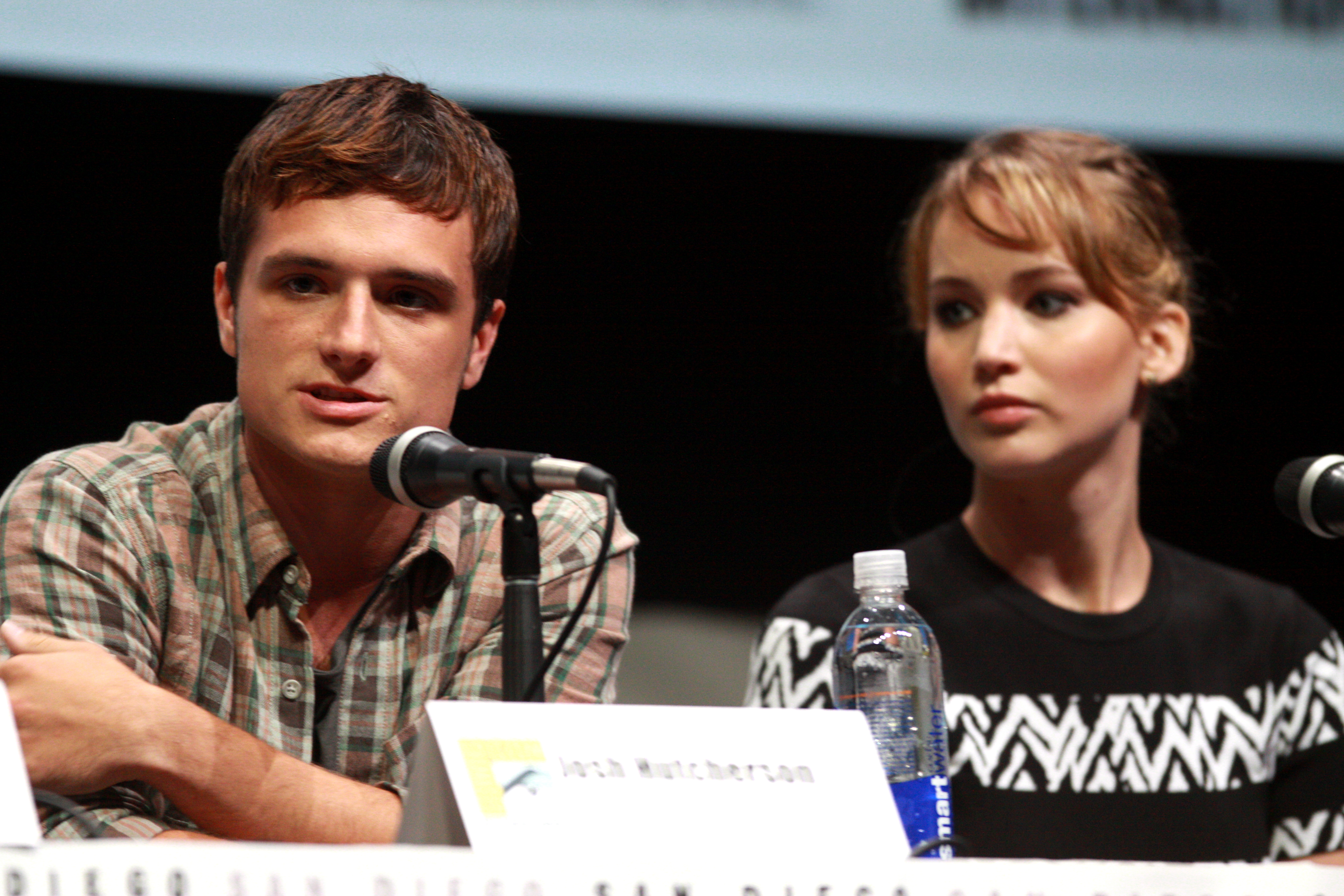
Hutcherson with co-star Jennifer Lawrence at the 2013 San Diego Comic-Con promoting The Hunger Games: Catching Fire

In 2013, Hutcherson voiced the character Nod in the animated action-adventure 3D film Epic, loosely based on William Joyce's book, The Leaf Men and the Brave Good Bugs; the film is his most commercially successful except for The Hunger Games series. As filming approached for The Hunger Games sequel, The Hunger Games: Catching Fire, he enlisted celebrity trainer Bobby Strom to assist him in five hour-long workouts per week. The film brought in $420 million at the North American box office, making it his most commercially successful film. Todd Gilchrist of Indiewire proclaimed of the actor's performance that "Hutcherson's maturing talents achieve a parallelism with the character's self-actualization, proving subtler and more self-aware with every resigned decision he makes on behalf of the people around him that he loves." Hutcherson received his second MTV Movie Award for "Best Male Performance" for his role in the sequel.

On November 23, 2013, the day following The Hunger Games: Catching Fire's United States release, Hutcherson hosted an episode of Saturday Night Live. His performance received mediocre reviews, with Mike Ryan of The Huffington Post stating that he did not really bring "anything special to the table except having a nice attitude", and John Surico of GQ remarking that "while the night didn't necessarily disappoint, it also didn't dazzle".

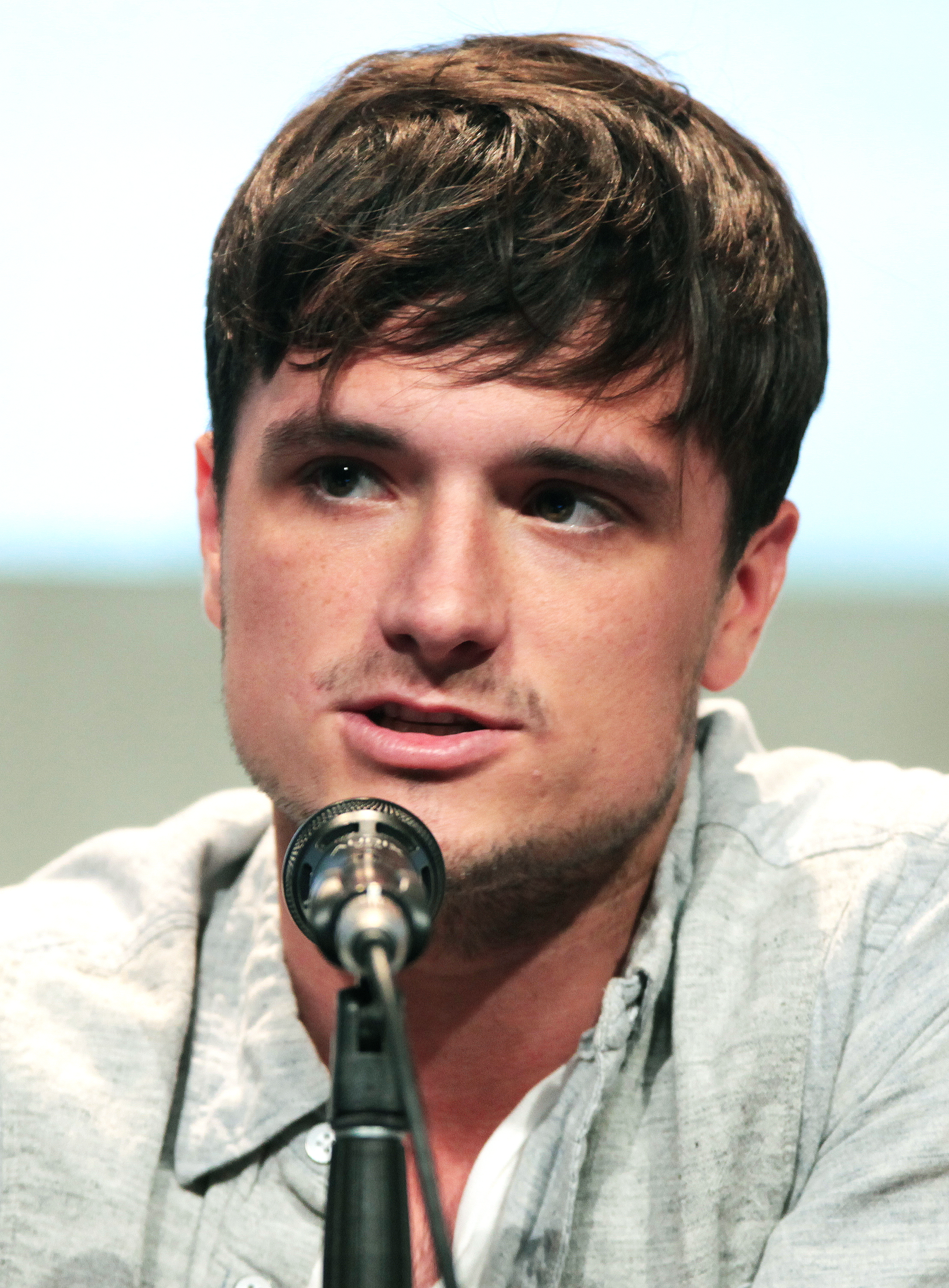
Hutcherson at the 2015 San Diego Comic-Con

Hutcherson again reprised his role in the two feature-length parts of the Mockingjay film adaptation. The Hunger Games: Mockingjay – Part 1 was released on November 21, 2014, and Part 2 followed on November 20, 2015. His character goes through a significant personality change in the films, which provided him with an acting challenge; he said, "I'm nervous about portraying it because I've never gone crazy before in a movie." Emily Yahr of The Washington Post spoke positively of his acting, by saying "Peeta's crazed expression is sure to haunt our nightmares for a long time," while David Edelstein of New York criticized his portrayal in relation to scenes with the other characters, saying "at least Josh Hutcherson's captured Peeta is mostly seen in interviews with Stanley Tucci's camp talk-show host on TV screens ... so the actor can't bring his lack of urgency to scenes with [Jennifer Lawrence]."

Before filming the Mockingjay movies, Hutcherson filmed Escobar: Paradise Lost, a French-Spanish thriller, which was released on January 16, 2015, in the U.S. He also served as an executive producer for the film, alongside first-time director Andrea Di Stefano, assisting with casting and blocking shots. Hutcherson said the opportunity "made [him] so hungry to do more like that".

=== 2016–2023: Career downturn and independent films ===
In the years following the conclusion of The Hunger Games, Hutcherson's career stalled. Hutcherson declared: "I knew only success, from the age 9 to, like, 24, then kind of post Hunger Games world ... The industry is so goddamn tricky, because they set you up in this way where they’re like, ‘You’ve arrived. You now are working with Jennifer Lawrence and Philip Seymour Hoffman, and you’re in this movie that makes billions of dollars, you’re the second lead of the film. (But) as quickly as they’re excited to get you into the spotlight, they want to not give you anything else ... So I tasted my first feeling of disappointment, failure, rejection, probably when I was 24 or so, 25. (Suddenly I was) not getting any offers (and) not getting cast."

During this time, he acted in independent films and produced a handful of short films including his 2017 directorial debut Ape. He also directed music videos for West Coast Massive and Foster the People. In a short period, he had supporting roles in three films directed by James Franco: The Long Home (unreleased), In Dubious Battle (2016), and The Disaster Artist (2017). Beginning in November 2017, Hutcherson starred in the science fiction comedy series Future Man on the video on demand service Hulu. Produced by Seth Rogen and Evan Goldberg, the show continued for three seasons, concluding in 2020. In 2019, he starred in the thriller film Burn and began voicing the lead character of Shinjiro Hayata in the Netflix anime Ultraman (2019–2023).

Hutcherson appeared in the 2022 Ernest Hemingway adaptation Across the River and Into the Trees and starred opposite Morgan Freeman in the 2023 science fiction thriller 57 Seconds.

=== 2023–present: Career resurgence ===
In late 2023, he starred as Mike Schmidt in the Blumhouse Productions film Five Nights at Freddy's, released in October 2023, which is based on the video game series of the same name. Amidst negative reviews, the film was a box office success and one of the year's best-performing horror films. In December 2023, a fan edit of Hutcherson from 2014, consisting of oversaturated images of the actor, with the song "Whistle" by Flo Rida playing in the background, went viral, with Hutcherson himself acknowledging the trend.

Hutcherson next appeared as the main antagonist Derek Danforth in the Jason Statham action film The Beekeeper, which was released on January 19, 2024, to commercial success. In late 2025, Hutcherson co-starred opposite Rachel Sennott in the HBO comedy series I Love LA. Sennott cast Hutcherson and reasoned: "I’ve been a fan of his since Bridge to Terabithia. I feel like when I met with him on Zoom, I was like, he’s so disarming and charming, and he immediately feels at home. He is warm and makes you feel comfortable. I think he has amazing comedic instincts. He’s really funny. I’ve seen him in dramatic stuff, but I was blown away by how funny he is." The first season was a success and the show was quickly renewed for a second season. He also reprised his role of Mike Schmidt in Five Nights at Freddy's 2, which was released in December 2025 and, like its predecessor, commercially successful but negatively received by critics. The success of I Love L.A, The Beekeeper, and the Five Nights at Freddy's movies led to what The New York Times called a "career renaissance" for Hutcherson. He will reprise his role as Peeta Mellark in The Hunger Games: Sunrise on the Reaping, slated for release in November 2026.

Hutcherson will voice the title character in the DC Studios animated series Mister Miracle.

== Personal life ==
Hutcherson has cited actor Jake Gyllenhaal as an inspiration, admiring the way Gyllenhaal "has taken his career and the kind of jobs that he's taken". He has named actor, director, and producer Philip Seymour Hoffman as another of his inspirations.

Hutcherson has been in a relationship with actress Claudia Traisac since 2013. As of 2024, Hutcherson splits his time between Los Angeles, California and Madrid, Spain. In May 2012, he purchased the 1,861-square-foot (172.9 m^{2}) $2.5 million former house of Heath Ledger in Laurel Canyon, Hollywood Hills, a small ranch built in 1951. He professes that fame has not changed him as a person, stating, "I love my job more than anything in the world and I could never imagine doing anything else. So this whole thing is a very small price to pay compared to someone who has to go to an office to work."

A known ally to the LGBT community, Hutcherson advocates the gay–straight alliance campaign "Straight But Not Narrow". Since its formation, he has been its most active supporter. His involvement with the LGBT community stems from his family ties; two of his uncles who were gay died of AIDS-related illnesses. In April 2012, he became the youngest recipient of the Vanguard Award from GLAAD, given for promoting equal rights for LGBT people. He was also awarded with Young Humanitarian Award at the 2015 unite4:humanity award ceremony. Regarding his own sexuality, he considers himself to be "mostly straight" and does not believe in being limited by labels. Hutcherson also worked alongside The Trevor Project and Human-I-T in 2014 when he began his campaign "Power On", which serves to help young LGBT people from rural areas to form communities by donating old computers and cell phones to LGBT resource centers; he began the campaign by donating an old computer of his own. Yearly in 2012–2014, he has hosted the "Josh Hutcherson Celebrity Basketball Game" in Los Angeles, which raises funds and awareness for the "Straight But Not Narrow" campaign. In November 2013, Hutcherson and Queen Latifah presented trophies together to four young community volunteers in a live ceremony at the fifth annual TeenNick HALO Awards at the Hollywood Palladium.

Hutcherson endorsed and actively campaigned for Senator Bernie Sanders for President in the 2016 and 2020 U.S. presidential elections.

== Filmography ==
Key
†	Denotes works that have not yet been released

=== Film ===
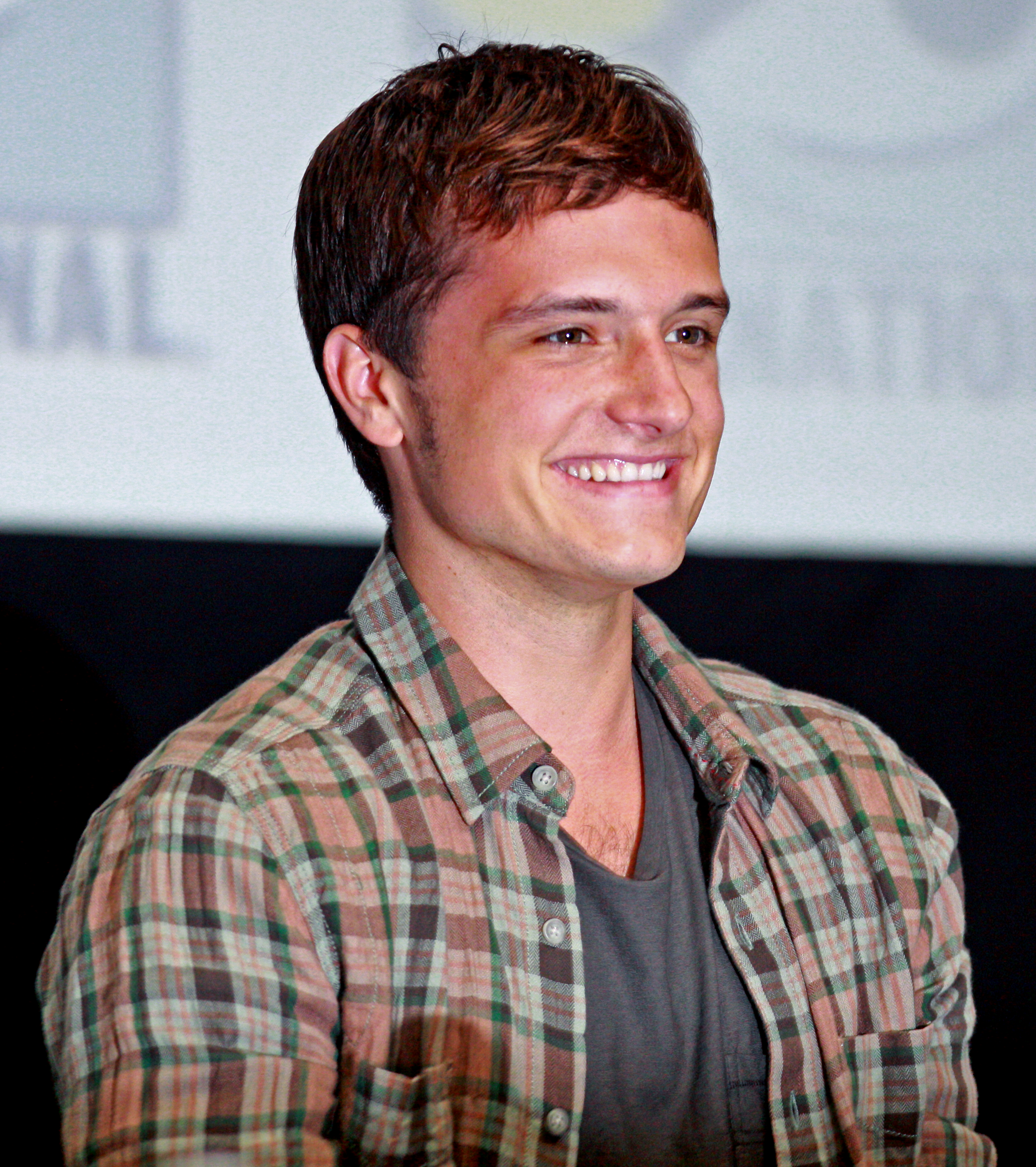
Hutcherson at the 2013 San Diego Comic-Con promoting The Hunger Games: Catching Fire

Year	Title	Role	Notes
2003	American Splendor	Robin	
2004	Motocross Kids	TJ	
2004	The Polar Express	Young Hero Boy	Additional motion capture only
2005	One Last Ride	Joey	
2005	Kicking & Screaming	Bucky Weston	
2005	Howl's Moving Castle	Markl (voice)	English dub
2005	Little Manhattan	Gabriel "Gabe" Burton	
2005	Zathura: A Space Adventure	Walter Budwing	
2006	RV	Carl Munro	
2007	Bridge to Terabithia	Jesse Aarons	
2007	Firehouse Dog	Shane Fahey	
2008	Winged Creatures	Jimmy Jaspersen	
2008	Journey to the Center of the Earth	Sean Anderson	
2009	Cirque du Freak: The Vampire's Assistant	Steve "Leopard" Leonard	
2010	The Kids Are All Right	Laser Allgood	
2010	The Third Rule	Chuck	Short film
2011	Detention	Clapton Davis	Also executive producer
2012	Journey 2: The Mysterious Island	Sean Anderson	
2012	The Hunger Games	Peeta Mellark	
2012	7 Days in Havana	Teddy Atkins	
2012	The Forger	Joshua Mason	Also executive producer
2012	Red Dawn	Robert Kitner	
2013	Epic	Nod (voice)	
2013	The Hunger Games: Catching Fire	Peeta Mellark	
2014	The Hunger Games: Mockingjay – Part 1	Peeta Mellark	
2015	Escobar: Paradise Lost	Nick Brady	Also executive producer
2015	The Hunger Games: Mockingjay – Part 2	Peeta Mellark	
2015	The Rusted	Max	Short film Also executive producer
2016	In Dubious Battle	Vinnie	
2016	The Long Home	Nathan Winer	Unreleased
2017	Ape	Travis Wilker	Short film Also director
2017	The Disaster Artist	Philip Haldiman	
2017	Tragedy Girls	Toby Mitchell	
2018	Elliot the Littlest Reindeer	Elliot (voice)	
2019	Burn	Billy	
2022	Across the River and into the Trees	Jackson	
2023	57 Seconds	Franklin Fausti	
2023	Five Nights at Freddy's	Mike Schmidt	
2024	The Beekeeper	Derek Danforth	
2024	Long Gone Heroes	David	
2025	Five Nights at Freddy's 2	Mike Schmidt	
2026	Signal One	Charlie Kaminsky	
2026	Let's Love	Jackson	
2026	The Hunger Games: Sunrise on the Reaping	Peeta Mellark	
TBA	Untitled Arkasha Stevenson film †		Post-production

=== Television ===
Year	Title	Role	Notes
2002	Becoming Glen	Young Glen	Pilot episode
2002	House Blend	Nicky Harper	Pilot episode
2002	ER	Matt	Episode: "First Snowfall"
2003	The Division	Matthew Inwood	Episode: "Till Death Do Us Part"
2003	Miracle Dogs	Charlie Logan	Television film
2003	Wilder Days	Chris Morse	Television film
2003	Line of Fire	Donny Rawlings	Episode: "Take the Money and Run"
2004	Eddie's Father	Eddie Corbett	Pilot episode
2004	Party Wagon	Toad Bartley (voice)	Television film
2004	Justice League Unlimited	Van-El (voice)	Episode: "For the Man Who Has Everything"
2010	The Third Rule	Chuck	Short film
2012	Punk'd	Himself	Episode: "Lucy Hale"
2013	Saturday Night Live	Host	Episode: "Josh Hutcherson / Haim"
2014	Face Off	Guest judge	Episode: "Let the Games Begin"
2017–2020	Future Man	Josh Futturman	Main role (34 episodes); Also producer
2019	Paquita Salas	Ryan	Episode: "Regional Dances"
2019–2023	Ultraman	Shinjiro Hayata (voice)	English dub
2025	I Love LA	Dylan	Main role (9 episodes)
2028	Mister Miracle †	Scott Free / Mister Miracle (voice)	Main role

=== Music videos ===
Year	Video	Artist(s)	Notes
2016	"Middle"	DJ Snake featuring Bipolar Sunshine	
2018	"Worst Nites"	Foster the People	Co-directed with Mark Foster

== Awards and nominations ==
During the first stage of Hutcherson's acting career, he received eight Young Artist Award nominations, four of which he won. He and the cast of 2010's The Kids Are All Right received eight nominations for "Best Cast" or "Best Ensemble" by eight different organizations including SAG-AFTRA and Broadcast Film Critics Association. For The Hunger Games, Hutcherson and his co-stars were nominated for ten awards, winning eight of them, including National Association of Theatre Owners' 2012 "Breakthrough Performer of the Year" and Logo TV's 2012 "Next Mega Star".

Year	Organization	Award	Work	Result
2004	Young Artist Awards	Best Performance in a TV Movie, Miniseries or Special – Leading Young Actor	Wilder Days	Nominated
2005	Young Artist Awards	Best Performance in a Feature Film – Young Ensemble Cast	Motocross Kids	Nominated
2005	Young Artist Awards	Outstanding Young Ensemble in a New Medium	The Polar Express	Won
2006	Young Artist Awards	Best Performance in a Feature Film (Comedy or Drama) – Leading Young Actor	Zathura: A Space Adventure	Won
2007	Young Artist Awards	Best Performance in a Feature Film – Leading Young Actor	RV	Nominated
2008	Young Artist Awards	Best Performance in a Feature Film – Leading Young Actor	Bridge to Terabithia	Won
2008	Young Artist Awards	Best Performance in a Feature Film – Young Ensemble Cast	Bridge to Terabithia	Won
2009	Young Artist Awards	Best Performance in a Feature Film – Leading Young Actor	Journey to the Center of the Earth	Nominated
2010	Gotham Awards	Best Ensemble Performance	The Kids Are All Right	Nominated
2010	Washington D.C. Area Film Critics Association	Best Ensemble	The Kids Are All Right	Nominated
2010	Boston Society of Film Critics	Best Cast	The Kids Are All Right	Nominated
2011	Alliance of Women Film Journalists	Best Ensemble Cast	The Kids Are All Right	Won
2011	Broadcast Film Critics Association Awards	Best Acting Ensemble	The Kids Are All Right	Nominated
2011	Screen Actors Guild Awards	Outstanding Performance by a Cast in a Motion Picture	The Kids Are All Right	Nominated
2012	NewNowNext Awards	Next Mega Star	The Hunger Games	Won
2012	CinemaCon Award	Breakthrough Performer of the Year Award	The Hunger Games	Won
2012	MTV Movie Awards	Best Cast	The Hunger Games	Nominated
2012	MTV Movie Awards	Best Kiss	The Hunger Games	Nominated
2012	MTV Movie Awards	Best Fight	The Hunger Games	Won
2012	MTV Movie Awards	Best Male Performance	The Hunger Games	Won
2012	Teen Choice Awards	Choice Movie: Liplock	The Hunger Games	Won
2012	Teen Choice Awards	Choice Movie Actor: Sci-Fi/Fantasy	The Hunger Games	Won
2012	Do Something Awards	Movie Star: Male	The Hunger Games	Won
2013	People's Choice Awards	Favorite On-Screen Chemistry	The Hunger Games	Won
2014	MTV Movie Awards	Best Performance	The Hunger Games: Catching Fire	Won
2014	Teen Choice Awards	Choice Movie Actor: Sci-Fi/Fantasy	The Hunger Games: Catching Fire	Won
2015	Teen Choice Awards	Choice Movie Actor: Sci-Fi/Fantasy	The Hunger Games: Mockingjay – Part 1	Won

=== State orders and honors ===
Hutcherson holds the commission of a Colonel of the Commonwealth of Kentucky.
