= Peeta Mellark =

Fictional character

- The Hunger Games character
- Josh Hutcherson as Peeta Mellark
- First appearance: The Hunger Games
- Last appearance: Sunrise on the Reaping
- Created by: Suzanne Collins
- Portrayed by: Josh Hutcherson

In-universe information
- Gender: Male
- Occupation: Artist; Baker
- Family: Otho Mellark (father, deceased); Mrs. Mellark (mother, deceased); Unnamed older brother (deceased); Unnamed older brother (deceased)
- Spouse: Katniss Everdeen
- Children: Unnamed son Unnamed daughter

Peeta Mellark is a fictional character of The Hunger Games trilogy written by American author Suzanne Collins. He is portrayed by Josh Hutcherson in the film adaptations.

Peeta is the male tribute representing District 12 in the 74th annual Hunger Games, alongside female tribute Katniss Everdeen (portrayed in the films by Jennifer Lawrence). Together, they defy the rule that the Games must have one victor, unintentionally inciting a rebellion against the authoritarian government of Panem.

== Appearances ==
=== The Hunger Games ===
Peeta is first introduced at the reaping for the 74th Hunger Games when he is selected as the male tribute representing District 12 alongside female tribute Katniss Everdeen. During an interview with Caesar Flickerman preceding the Games, Peeta admits on national television to having a long-standing crush on Katniss. She assumes this is merely part of his strategy to win favor from wealthy Capitol sponsors. Prior to this encounter, Peeta and Katniss had only met once, when he had burned bread to give to a hungry Katniss.

Once inside the arena, Peeta allies himself with the "Career" (from districts 1, 2 and 4) tributes and tricks them into believing he will lead them to Katniss. However, after Katniss knocks down a hive of Tracker Jackers on her pursuers, she herself is stung with the insects venom, rendering her disoriented and vulnerable. Peeta urges Katniss to run and stays to fight fellow tribute Cato while she escapes. He survives the encounter with Cato but suffers a stab wound on his leg. He camouflages himself into the rocks and mud alongside a riverbank, slowly dying of blood poisoning until Katniss finds him days later.

Following an announcement proclaiming there can now be two winners, if both originate from the same district, Katniss and Peeta become allies. Katniss realizes that if they play up the love story they may garner viewers' affections. Katniss slips away and comes back with medicine strong enough to heal both of their wounds by morning.

After killing Cato, Katniss and Peeta are the only remaining survivors. However, an announcement shortly afterwards revokes the previous revision, allowing for only one victor. Peeta suggests that Katniss should kill him, enabling her to return home. Katniss instead suggests they commit suicide by consuming poisonous berries known as Nightlock. Before the two are able to get the berries into their mouths, an announcement is made pleading for the two to stop, and Katniss and Peeta are declared joint official winners of the 74th Hunger Games. Later, the two learn President Snow considered their actions to be an act of rebellion against the Capitol. After their last interview, Peeta comes to the realization Katniss has staged her love for him all along.

=== Catching Fire ===
Peeta and Katniss embark on the Victory Tour, an event where the victors visit the districts as a reminder about the Games. At the start of the Victory Tour, Peeta expresses his desire to be friends with Katniss. Later, he tries to give part of his winnings to the families of District 11's most recently fallen tributes (Rue and Thresh) and is made to watch “Peacekeepers” kill a man who led the three finger salute to the two victors. Before the Victory Tour, President Snow tells Katniss that she and Peeta must prove they are in love with each other to quench the possibility of a district rebellion.

Katniss and Peeta think they are going to become mentors for the Quarter Quell, a special Hunger Games that occurs every 25 years that comes with a change in rules. The new twist for the 75th Games is that the tributes will be chosen from living victors. District 12 has only three living victors: Katniss, Peeta, and Haymitch, their constantly drunken mentor who won the 50th Hunger Games (the Second Quarter Quell). Katniss becomes the female tribute, as she is the only living female District 12 victor. When Haymitch is drawn as the male tribute, Peeta volunteers to take his place. Peeta hopes to play on the other tributes' sympathies to gain protection in the arena and support from sponsors for Katniss. To this end, he lies on national television, saying Katniss and he had secretly got married before the Quell was announced, and that Katniss is pregnant.

At the Cornucopia, Peeta allies with Katniss, Mags, and District 4 male tribute Finnick Odair. The three soon band together with a few other tributes: Beetee and Wiress from District 3, and Johanna Mason from District 7. Eventually, they find out the arena is shaped like a clock, with 12 sections, and each section is triggered at the same time each day. During this, Katniss then realizes she has feelings for Peeta. While Katniss destroys the field, Peeta, Johanna, and Enobaria are captured by the Capitol. Finnick, Beetee, Haymitch, Johanna, and a few other tributes were part of a plan to safely retrieve Katniss and Peeta from the arena with hopes that they would take on roles to start a revolution against the Capitol. Following the rescue, District 12 is destroyed by President Snow's firebombing.

=== Mockingjay ===
Peeta is captured by the Capitol and is tortured physically, emotionally, and mentally. The Capitol turns Peeta against Katniss, distorting his feelings and memories to make him hate her. This leads him to try and strangle Katniss when he is reunited with her in District 13. The doctors of District 13 try to undo his hijacking, but the process is slow.

When the rest of the victors' journey to the Capitol to fight, Peeta is initially kept behind because he is considered too unstable to be sent into combat. However, President Coin changes her mind and sends him not only into combat but assigns him to Katniss's squadron. Despite the fact that the members of the squadron do not trust him, they try to help with his recovery. Unfortunately, during a surprise attack, Peeta loses his sanity again, becoming responsible at least in part for the death of one of their team members, who he accidentally throws into a barbed-wire net pod during the attack. The squadron repeatedly debate whether or not they should kill Peeta, and even Peeta himself asks to be killed to stop endangering them, but Katniss refuses to when realizing she cannot bring herself to let him die.

Realizing he cannot convince anyone to kill him or leave him to die, Peeta insists on remaining cuffed instead since the pain in his wrists helps him stay focused in reality instead of succumbing to madness. Further on in the Capitol, the nightmares in Peeta's mind become so intense that he is on the brink of losing his sanity, but Katniss manages to reach him.

After the rebels win the war, Katniss is driven to depression and mental instability due to the death of her sister, Prim. Peeta's hijacking is soon mostly recovered by several doctors and he is considered mentally stable and finally back to his former self. Upon returning home, he plants primroses, the flower which Prim was named after, in memory of her. Katniss and Peeta resume their lives together in what remains of District 12, fall back in love, and move in together. The story ends with Katniss finally admitting her love for Peeta.

In the epilogue, Katniss and Peeta have two children together. He still has moments where his hijacking will try to take over again, causing Peeta to clench onto something until the attempt passes.

=== Sunrise on the Reaping ===
Katniss and Peeta appear in the epilogue where Haymitch notes how much Katniss as a child reminded him of his old sweetheart Louella McCoy and while he hadn't wanted to let Katniss and Peeta in when he first met them, Haymitch couldn't help it. The couple ask Haymitch to take part in their memorial book and while he doesn't want to at first, Haymitch finally shares his story with them, telling Katniss and Peeta about the family, tributes, friends, comrades in arms, his girlfriend, and everyone else that he ever loved and lost along the way. Katniss later brings Haymitch goose eggs to raise which Peeta builds an incubator for.

== Characterization ==
Peeta is the same age as Katniss, making him 16 years old in The Hunger Games and 17–18 in Catching Fire and Mockingjay.

Peeta is of medium height and stocky build, and has ashy blond hair. He has blue eyes. Peeta's features are described as ranging from handsome, to striking, to even beautiful by Katniss, some of which is brought up and highlighted during his first interview with Caesar Flickerman. Part of Peeta's left leg was amputated following the 74th Hunger Games, forcing him to walk with the aid of a prosthetic leg for the rest of his life. In the 2012 film adaptation, his leg is never amputated.

Peeta is considered charming and generous, and possesses a self-deprecating sense of humor. He first confuses and later inspires Katniss with his determination to maintain his identity while inside the arena and his refusal to be complicit with the Capitol.

Through working at his family's bakery, he gained skills in camouflage painting that would later aid him in the games. Peeta excels at hand-to-hand combat due to his history of wrestling in his school years. Other skills include handling knives, and starting fires. He is initially responsible for endearing Katniss to the Capitol through a performance of romance, and Katniss claims that Peeta is invaluable to the revolution because of his ability "to turn his pain into words that will transform people."

When asked about the additions of Peeta and Gale to the world of The Hunger Games, Suzanne Collins stated that Peeta's natural inclination is towards diplomacy, in contrast to Gale's more violent outlook. Additionally, she explains that the love triangle between Katniss, Peeta and Gale is more about Katniss figuring out her worldview rather than just deciding on a partner.

== Film ==
On March 23, 2011, Lionsgate began casting the role of Peeta for the film of The Hunger Games. According to The Hollywood Reporter, contenders for the role included Josh Hutcherson, Alexander Ludwig (later cast as Cato), Hunter Parrish, Lucas Till, and Evan Peters. On April 4, 2011, Lionsgate announced that Hutcherson would play the role.

Awards and achievements
Preceded by 73rd Hunger Games; Unknown	Victor of The Hunger Games; 74th Hunger Games (with Katniss Everdeen)	Succeeded by 75th Hunger Games (3rd Quarter Quell); Katniss Everdeen, Peeta Mellark, Finnick Odair, Johanna Mason, Beetee Latier, & Enobaria
