= 18th César Awards =

French film awards honouring 1992

- Date: 8 March 1993
- Site: Théâtre des Champs-Élysées, Paris, France
- Hosted by: Frédéric Mitterrand

Highlights
- Best Film: Savage Nights
- Best Actor: Jacques Dutronc
- Best Actress: Jeanne Moreau

Television coverage
- Network: France 2

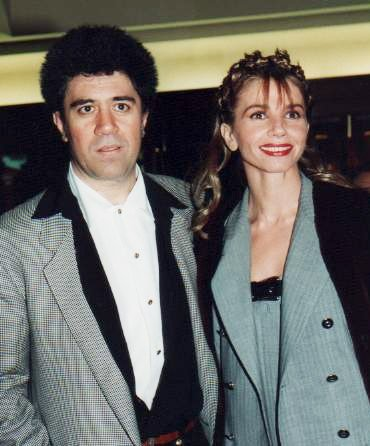
Pedro Almodovar and Victoria Abril at the César Awards ceremony.

The 18th César Awards ceremony, presented by the Académie des Arts et Techniques du Cinéma, honoured the best French films of 1992 and took place on 8 March 1993 at the Théâtre des Champs-Élysées in Paris. The ceremony was chaired by Marcello Mastroianni and hosted by Frédéric Mitterrand. Savage Nights won the award for Best Film.

== Winners and nominees ==
The winners are highlighted in bold:

- Best Film:
  **Savage Nights**, directed by Cyril Collard
  La Crise, directed by Coline Serreau
  Indochine, directed by Régis Wargnier
  L.627, directed by Bertrand Tavernier
  Le petit prince a dit, directed by Christine Pascal
  Un coeur en hiver, directed by Claude Sautet
- Best Foreign Film:
  **Tacones lejanos**, directed by Pedro Almodóvar
  L'Amant, directed by Jean-Jacques Annaud
  Howards End, directed by James Ivory
  Husbands and Wives, directed by Woody Allen
  The Player, directed by Robert Altman
- Best Debut:
  **Les Nuits fauves**, directed by Cyril Collard
  Nord, directed by Xavier Beauvois
  Riens du tout, directed by Cédric Klapisch
  La Sentinelle, directed by Arnaud Desplechin
  Le Zèbre, directed by Jean Poiret
- Best Actor:
  **Claude Rich**, for Le Souper
  Vincent Lindon, for La Crise
  Richard Berry, for Le petit prince a dit
  Claude Brasseur, for Le Souper
  Daniel Auteuil, for Un coeur en hiver
- Best Actress:
  **Catherine Deneuve**, for Indochine
  Juliette Binoche, for Damage
  Anémone, for Le petit prince a dit
  Emmanuelle Béart, for Un coeur en hiver
  Caroline Cellier, for Le Zèbre
- Best Supporting Actor:
  **André Dussollier**, for Un coeur en hiver
  Patrick Timsit, for La Crise
  Jean Yanne, for Indochine
  Jean-Pierre Marielle, for Max & Jeremie
  Fabrice Luchini, for Le Retour de Casanova
- Best Supporting Actress:
  **Dominique Blanc**, for Indochine
  Zabou Breitman, for La Crise
  Michèle Laroque, for La Crise
  Maria Pacôme, for La Crise
  Brigitte Catillon, for Un coeur en hiver
- Most Promising Actor:
  **Emmanuel Salinger**, for La Sentinelle
  Julien Rassam, for L'Accompagnatrice
  Olivier Martinez, for IP5: L'île aux pachydermes
  Xavier Beauvois, for Nord
  Grégoire Colin, for Olivier, Olivier
- Most Promising Actress:
  **Romane Bohringer**, for Les Nuits fauves
  Isabelle Carré, for Beau fixe
  Elsa Zylberstein, for Beau fixe
  Linh Dan Pham, for Indochine
  Charlotte Kady, for L.627
- Best Director:
  **Claude Sautet**, for Un coeur en hiver
  Régis Wargnier, for Indochine
  Bertrand Tavernier, for L.627
  Cyril Collard, for Les Nuits fauves
  Christine Pascal, for Le petit prince a dit
- Best Original Screenplay or Adaptation:
  **Coline Serreau**, for La Crise
  Michel Alexandre, Bertrand Tavernier, for L.627
  Cyril Collard, Claude Sautet, for Les Nuits fauves
  Arnaud Desplechin, for La Sentinelle
  Jacques Fieschi, for Un coeur en hiver
- Best Cinematography:
  **François Catonné**, for Indochine
  Yves Angelo, for L'Accompagnatrice and Un coeur en hiver
  Robert Fraisse, for L'Amant
- Best Costume Design:
  **Sylvie de Segonzac**, for Le Souper
  Yvonne Sassinot de Nesle, for L'Amant
  Pierre-Yves Gayraud, Gabriella Pescucci, for Indochine
- Best Sound:
  **Dominique Hennequin, Guillaume Sciama**, for Indochine
  Paul Lainé, Gérard Lamps, for L'Accompagnatrice
  Pierre Lenoir, Jean-Paul Loublier, for Un coeur en hiver
- Best Editing:
  **Lise Beaulieu**, for Les Nuits fauves
  Noëlle Boisson, for L'Amant
  Geneviève Winding, for Indochine
- Best Music:
  **Gabriel Yared**, for L'Amant
  Georges Delerue, for Diên Biên Phu
  Patrick Doyle, for Indochine
  René-Marc Bini, for Les Nuits fauves
- Best Production Design:
  **Jacques Bufnoir**, for Indochine
  Hoang Thanh At, for L'Amant
  François de Lamothe, for Le Souper
- Best Short Film:
  **Versailles Rive-Gauche**, directed by Bruno Podalydès
  Le Balayeur, directed by Serge Elissalde
  Hammam, directed by Florence Miailhe
  Omnibus, directed by Sam Karmann
- Honorary César:
  Jean Marais
  Marcello Mastroianni
  Gérard Oury

== See also ==
- 65th Academy Awards
- 46th British Academy Film Awards
