= 46th British Academy Film Awards =

1993 film awards ceremony

- Date: 21 March 1993
- Site: Theatre Royal, Drury Lane
- Hosted by: Griff Rhys Jones

Highlights
- Best Film: Howards End
- Best British Film: The Crying Game
- Best Actor: Robert Downey Jr. Chaplin
- Best Actress: Emma Thompson; Howards End
- Most awards: Strictly Ballroom (3)
- Most nominations: Howards End (11)

The 46th British Academy Film Awards, more commonly known as the BAFTAs, took place on 21 March 1993 at the Theatre Royal, Drury Lane in London, honouring the best national and foreign films of 1992. Presented by the British Academy of Film and Television Arts, accolades were handed out for the best feature-length film and documentaries of any nationality that were screened at British cinemas in 1992.

James Ivory's Howards End won the awards for Best Film and Best Actress (Emma Thompson). Robert Downey Jr. was voted Best Actor for his role in Chaplin. Best Supporting Actor and Actress were Gene Hackman (Unforgiven) and Miranda Richardson (Damage). Robert Altman won the award for Best Director for directing The Player.

The ceremony was hosted by Griff Rhys Jones.

== Winners and nominees ==
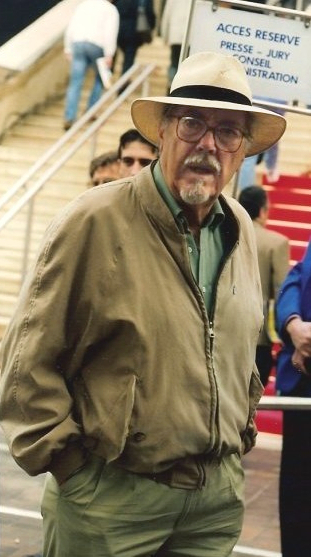
Robert Altman, Best Director winner

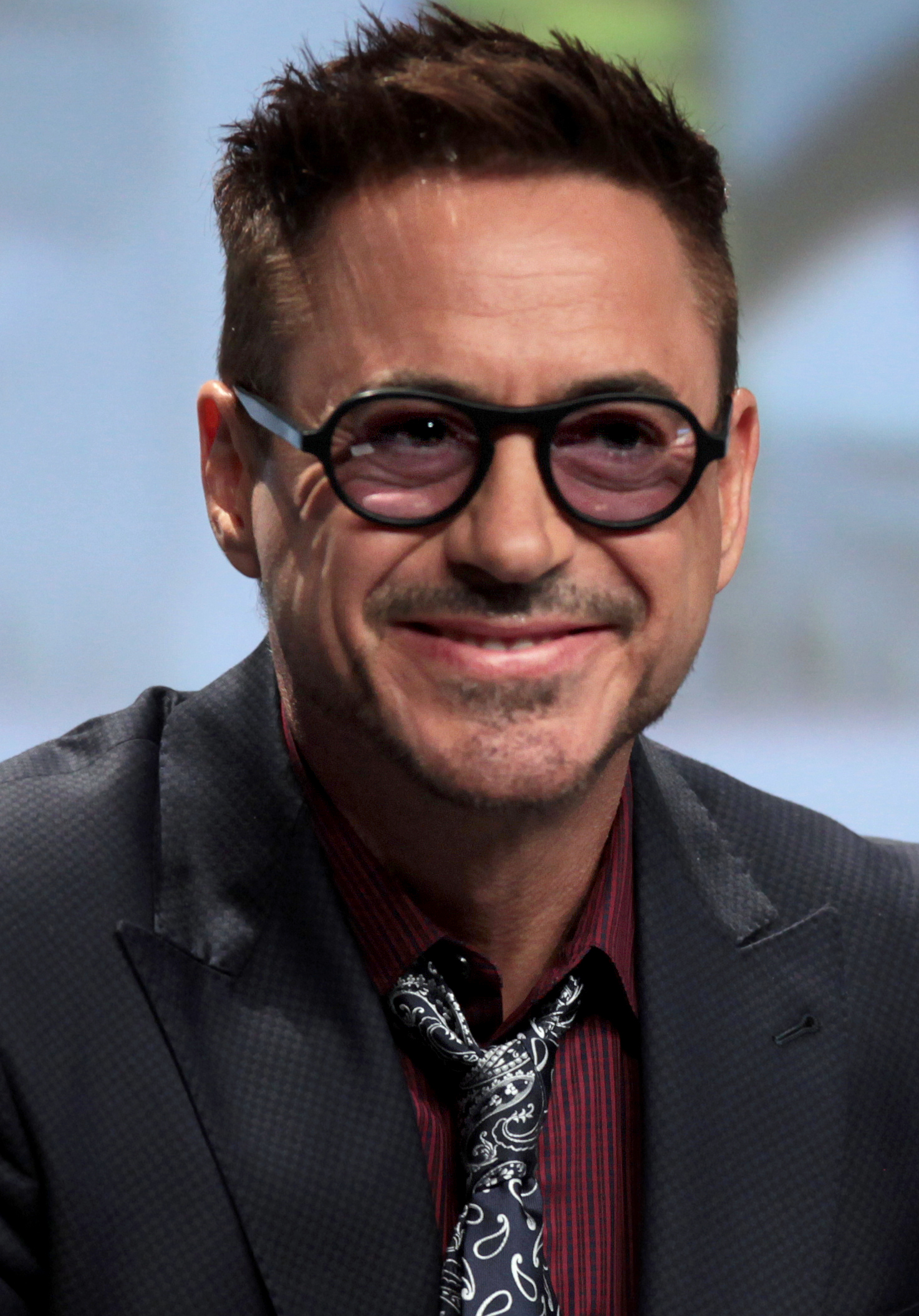
Robert Downey Jr., Best Actor winner

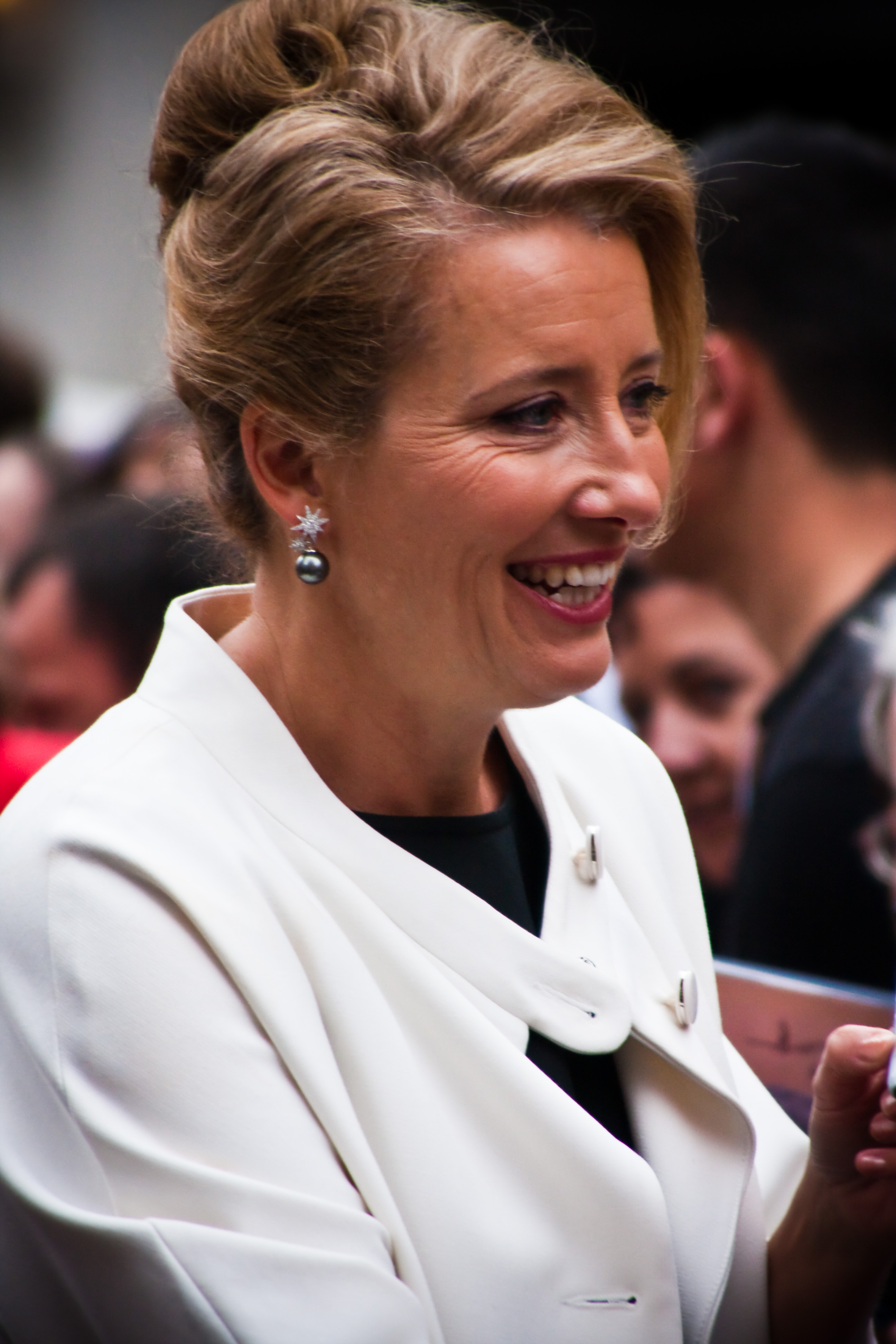
Emma Thompson, Best Actress winner

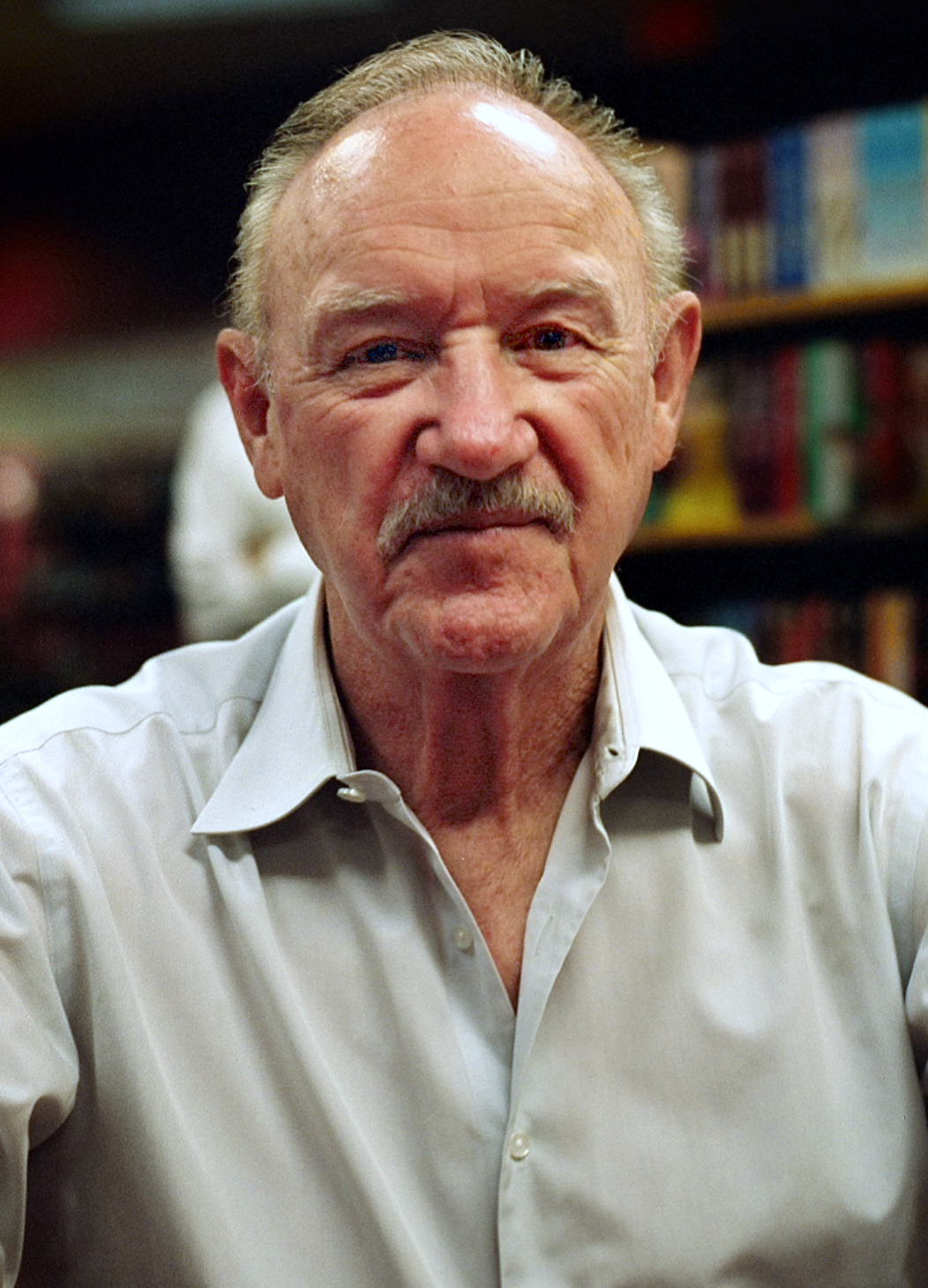
Gene Hackman, Best Supporting Actor winner

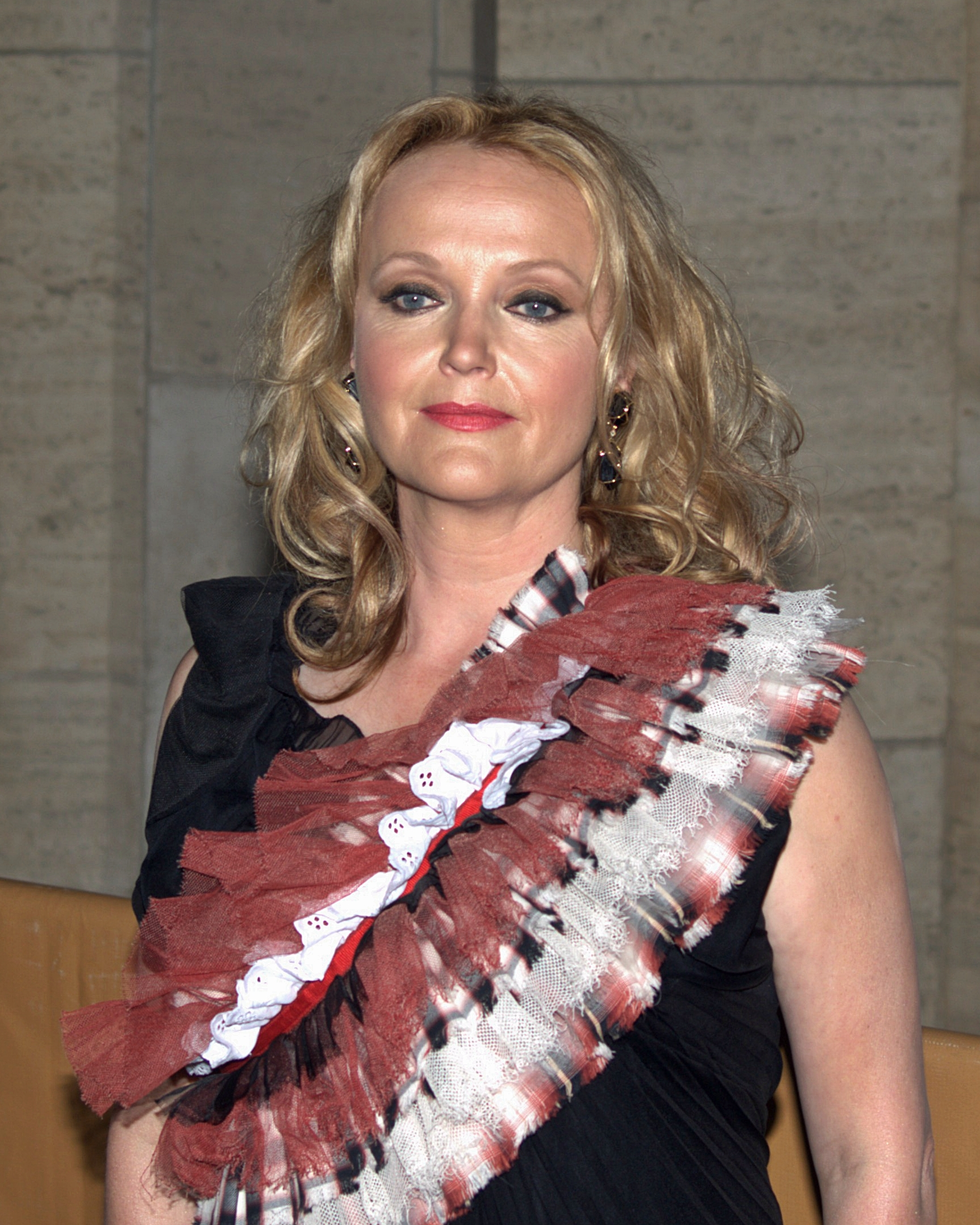
Miranda Richardson, Best Supporting Actress winner

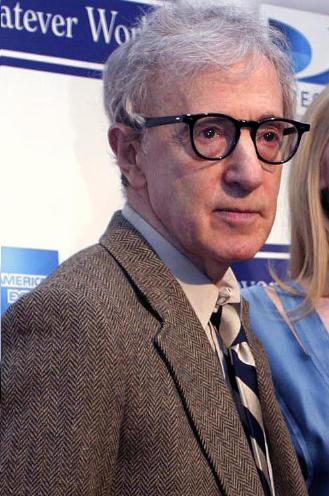
Woody Allen, Best Original Screenplay winner

=== BAFTA Fellowship ===
- **Sydney Samuelson** and **Colin Young**

=== Outstanding British Contribution to Cinema ===
- **Kenneth Branagh**

=== BAFTA Special Award ===
- **HRH The Princess Royal** and **Maggie Smith**

=== BAFTA Special Award for Craft ===
- **Douglas Slocombe**

=== Awards ===
Winners are listed first and highlighted in boldface.

| **Best Film**: **Howards End – Ismail Merchant and James Ivory**; The Crying Game – Stephen Woolley and Neil Jordan; The Player – David Brown, Michael Tolkin, Nick Wechsler and Robert Altman; Strictly Ballroom – Tristram Miall and Baz Luhrmann; Unforgiven – Clint Eastwood | **Best Direction**: **Robert Altman – The Player**; Clint Eastwood – Unforgiven; James Ivory – Howards End; Neil Jordan – The Crying Game |
| **Best Actor in a Leading Role**: **Robert Downey Jr. – Chaplin as Charlie Chaplin**; Daniel Day-Lewis – The Last of the Mohicans as Hawkeye/Nathaniel Poe/La Longue Carabine; Stephen Rea – The Crying Game as Fergus; Tim Robbins – The Player as Griffin Mill | **Best Actress in a Leading Role**: **Emma Thompson – Howards End as Margaret Schlegel**; Judy Davis – Husbands and Wives as Sally Simmons; Tara Morice – Strictly Ballroom as Fran; Jessica Tandy – Fried Green Tomatoes as Ninny Threadgoode |
| **Best Actor in a Supporting Role**: **Gene Hackman – Unforgiven as Bill Daggett**; Jaye Davidson – The Crying Game as Dil; Tommy Lee Jones – JFK as Clay Shaw/Clay Bertrand; Samuel West – Howards End as Leonard Bast | **Best Actress in a Supporting Role**: **Miranda Richardson – Damage as Ingrid Thompson-Fleming**; Kathy Bates – Fried Green Tomatoes as Evelyn Couch; Helena Bonham Carter – Howards End as Helen Schlegel; Miranda Richardson – The Crying Game as Jude |
| **Best Original Screenplay**: **Husbands and Wives – Woody Allen**; The Crying Game – Neil Jordan; Hear My Song – Peter Chelsom and Adrian Dunbar; Unforgiven – David Peoples | **Best Adapted Screenplay**: **The Player – Michael Tolkin**; Howards End – Ruth Prawer Jhabvala; JFK – Oliver Stone and Zachary Sklar; Strictly Ballroom – Baz Luhrmann and Craig Pearce |
| **Best Cinematography**: **The Last of the Mohicans – Dante Spinotti**; Cape Fear – Freddie Francis; Howards End – Tony Pierce-Roberts; Unforgiven – Jack N. Green | **Best Costume Design**: **Strictly Ballroom – Angus Strathie and Catherine Martin**; Chaplin – John Mollo and Ellen Mirojnick; Howards End – Jenny Beavan and John Bright; The Last of the Mohicans – Elsa Zamparelli |
| **Best Editing**: **JFK – Joe Hutshing and Pietro Scalia**; Cape Fear – Thelma Schoonmaker; Howards End – Andrew Marcus; The Player – Geraldine Peroni; Strictly Ballroom – Jill Bilcock | **Best Makeup and Hair**: **The Last of the Mohicans – Peter Robb-King**; Batman Returns – Ve Neill and Stan Winston; Chaplin – Wally Schneiderman, Jill Rockow and John Caglione Jr.; Howards End – Christine Beveridge |
| **Best Original Music**: **Strictly Ballroom – David Hirschfelder**; Beauty and the Beast – Alan Menken and Howard Ashman; Hear My Song – John Altman; The Last of the Mohicans – Trevor Jones and Randy Edelman | **Best Production Design**: **Strictly Ballroom – Catherine Martin**; Chaplin – Stuart Craig; Howards End – Luciana Arrighi; The Last of the Mohicans – Wolf Kroeger |
| **Best Sound**: **JFK – Tod A. Maitland, Wylie Stateman, Michael D. Wilhoit, Michael Minkler and Gregg Landaker**; The Last of the Mohicans – Simon Kaye, Lon Bender, Larry Kemp, Paul Massey, Doug Hemphill, Mark Smith and Chris Jenkins; Strictly Ballroom – Antony Gray, Ben Osmo, Roger Savage, Ian McLoughlin and Phil Judd; Unforgiven – Alan Robert Murray, Walter Newman, Rob Young, Les Fresholtz, Vern Poore and Dick Alexander | **Best Special Visual Effects**: **Death Becomes Her – Michael Lantieri, Ken Ralston, Alec Gillis, Tom Woodruff Jr., Doug Chiang and Doug Smythe**; Alien 3 – Richard Edlund, George Gibbs, Alec Gillis and Tom Woodruff Jr.; Batman Returns – Michael Fink, John Bruno, Craig Barron and Dennis Skotak; Beauty and the Beast – Randy Fullmer |
| **Outstanding British Film**: **The Crying Game – Stephen Woolley and Neil Jordan**; No other nominees | **Best Film Not in the English Language**: **Raise the Red Lantern – Chiu Fu-sheng and Zhang Yimou**; Delicatessen – Claudie Ossard, Jean-Pierre Jeunet and Marc Caro; Europa Europa – Artur Brauner, Margaret Ménégoz and Agnieszka Holland; Les Amants du Pont-Neuf – Christian Fechner and Leos Carax |
| **Best Short Animation**: **Daumier's Law – Ginger Gibbons and Geoff Dunbar**; A Is for Autism – Dick Arnall and Tim Webb; Blindscape – Stephen Palmer; Soho Square – Pam Dennis, Sue Paxton and Mario Cavalli | **Best Short Film**: **Omnibus – Anne Bennet and Sam Karmann**; Heartsongs – Caroline Hewitt and Sue Clayton; A Sense of History – Simon Channing Williams and Mike Leigh; Two Chimney Sweeps in a Singer's House – Michel Caulea |

== Statistics ==
Films that received multiple nominations
| Nominations | Film |
|---|---|
| 11 | Howards End |
| 8 | Strictly Ballroom |
| 7 | The Crying Game |
| 7 | The Last of the Mohicans |
| 6 | Unforgiven |
| 5 | The Player |
| 4 | Chaplin |
| 4 | JFK |
| 2 | Batman Returns |
| 2 | Beauty and the Beast |
| 2 | Cape Fear |
| 2 | Fried Green Tomatoes |
| 2 | Hear My Song |
| 2 | Husbands and Wives |

Films that received multiple awards
| Awards | Film |
|---|---|
| 3 | Strictly Ballroom |
| 2 | Howards End |
| 2 | JFK |
| 2 | The Last of the Mohicans |
| 2 | The Player |

== See also ==
- 65th Academy Awards
- 18th César Awards
- 45th Directors Guild of America Awards
- 6th European Film Awards
- 50th Golden Globe Awards
- 4th Golden Laurel Awards
- 13th Golden Raspberry Awards
- 7th Goya Awards
- 8th Independent Spirit Awards
- 19th Saturn Awards
- 45th Writers Guild of America Awards
