= Hooker Falls =

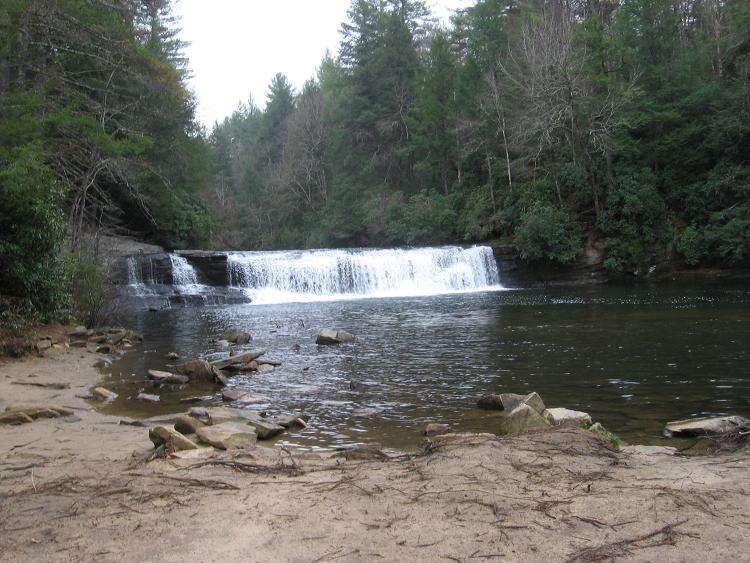
- Hooker Falls, Mar 2007
- Interactive map of Hooker Falls
- Location: DuPont State Forest, Transylvania County, in the Blue Ridge Mountains of North Carolina
- Coordinates: 35.202110°N 82.623752°W
- Type: Block, Cascade
- Total height: 14 ft (4 m)
- Number of drops: 2

Hooker Falls is a 14 ft (4.3 m) waterfall located in the DuPont State Forest, southeast of Brevard, North Carolina.

== Geology ==
Hooker Falls flows on the Little River through the DuPont State Forest. It is one of 4 major waterfalls on the Little River in this area, the others being High Falls, Triple Falls, and Bridal Veil Falls.

== History ==
Hooker Falls has been known for years to local residents and was named for Edmund Hooker, who operated a mill below the falls in the late 1800s. At the time, it was named Mill Shoals Falls. The Falls can be seen in movies like Last of the Mohicans and the Hunger Games.

In the 1990s, DuPont Forest was sold to the State of North Carolina, and as DuPont has completed cleanup of various areas, those areas have been made open to the public.

== Visiting Hooker Falls ==
Visitors may park at the Hooker Falls parking area, and then hike the short Hooker Falls Trail for roughly 0.25 miles (0.40 km). There are 2 views of the falls, the first overlooking the falls from above, and a second view from across the plunge pool that lets you view the entire falls.

DuPont State Forest may also allow access to the falls to handicapped persons. Contact the DuPont State Forest for more information.

== Nearby falls ==
- Triple Falls
- High Falls
- Bridal Veil Falls
- Wintergreen Falls
- Connestee Falls and Batson Creek Falls
- Key Falls
- Glen Cannon Falls
- Turley Falls

== See also ==
- List of waterfalls
- List of waterfalls in North Carolina
