= The Last of the Mohicans (1992 film) =

1992 film by Michael Mann

- Theatrical release poster
- Directed by: Michael Mann
- Screenplay by: Michael Mann; Christopher Crowe
- Based on: The Last of the Mohicans by James Fenimore Cooper; The Last of the Mohicans by Philip Dunne
- Produced by: Michael Mann; Hunt Lowry
- Starring: Daniel Day-Lewis; Madeleine Stowe; Jodhi May
- Cinematography: Dante Spinotti
- Edited by: Dov Hoenig; Arthur Schmidt
- Music by: Trevor Jones; Randy Edelman
- Production company: Morgan Creek Productions
- Distributed by: 20th Century Fox (United States and Canada); Morgan Creek International (International)
- Release dates: August 26, 1992 (France); September 25, 1992 (United States)
- Running time: 112 minutes
- Country: United States
- Languages: English; French; Mohawk; Cherokee; Delaware
- Budget: $40 million
- Box office: $143 million

The Last of the Mohicans is a 1992 American epic historical drama war film co-produced and directed by Michael Mann, who co-wrote the screenplay with Christopher Crowe, based on the 1826 novel of the same name by James Fenimore Cooper and its 1936 film adaptation. The film is set in 1757 during the French and Indian War. It stars Daniel Day-Lewis, Madeleine Stowe, and Jodhi May in the leading roles, and features Russell Means, Wes Studi, Eric Schweig, Steven Waddington, Maurice Roëves and Patrice Chéreau.

The film was released in the United States by 20th Century Fox on September 25, 1992, with Morgan Creek International releasing in other territories. It received generally positive reviews from critics and was a commercial success, grossing $143 million against a $40 million budget. It won the Academy Award for Best Sound, the only Academy Award won by a film directed by Mann to date. It was also nominated for seven BAFTA Awards, including Best Actor in a Leading Role for Day-Lewis, and won Best Cinematography and Best Make-up Artist.

== Plot ==
In 1757, during the French and Indian War, Mohican Chingachgook, his son, Uncas, and his white, adopted son, "Hawkeye," are travelling through the upstate New York wilderness. Stopping at the farm of a friend, they learn of the British Army's intent to incorporate the colonial militia into their forces to fight against the French and their Indian allies. While some of the colonials and local native tribes agree to join the militia on the condition that they will be released to defend their homes should the French or Indians attack, Hawkeye, the Mohicans, and others show no interest.

British Army Major Duncan Heyward arrives in Albany, New York, reports to commanding officer General Jerome Webb and is assigned to Colonel Edmund Munro, the commander of Fort William Henry in the Adirondack Mountains (historically George Monro). Heyward is tasked with escorting Munro's two daughters, Cora and Alice, to their father. Before they leave, Heyward asks Cora to marry him, but she asks for more time before giving her answer.

A Huron named Magua, masquerading as a Mohawk ally, is tasked with guiding Heyward, the two women, and a troop of British soldiers to the fort, but instead leads them into an ambush that kills most of the soldiers. Hawkeye, Chingachgook, and Uncas, who had been tracking the Huron war party, arrive and kill all of the Hurons except Magua, who escapes. The trio agrees to take the women and Heyward to the fort. Reaching their friends' farm, they find their friends massacred by an enemy Ottawa war party, but do not stop to bury the victims so as to not alert the Hurons to their having been there. As their journey continues, Cora and Hawkeye become attracted to each other, while Uncas begins to show an interest in Alice.

They find the fort under siege by the French and their Huron allies, but manage to sneak in. Colonel Munro is surprised to see his daughters, as he had sent a letter to them in Albany warning them to stay away, which never reached them. During the siege, a romance blossoms between Hawkeye and Cora. Heyward becomes jealous of Hawkeye when Cora tells Heyward she will not accept his marriage proposal. A militiaman sets out at night to try to reach General Webb at Fort Edward with a dispatch for reinforcements, with Hawkeye, Chingachgook, and Uncas providing covering fire from the fort.

Hawkeye and the militiamen confront Munro about the agreement with Webb that the militiamen could leave to protect their homesteads if they were threatened. After Heyward lies about the massacre at the farm, Munro refuses to honor the agreement. Hawkeye helps the men sneak away, and is arrested for sedition and sentenced to hang. In a parley with French General Louis-Joseph de Montcalm, when Munro learns that Webb will send no reinforcements, he is forced to accept Montcalm's terms of surrender, which include the promise that the British can leave the fort honorably with their arms. Magua is furious because he bears a personal grudge against Munro, whom he blames for the murder of his family and his own enslavement by the Mohawk; Montcalm tacitly agrees to allow Magua to attack the British once they have left the fort.

Once Munro, his soldiers, and the civilians (with Hawkeye still a prisoner) have left the fort and traveled some distance, Huron warriors led by Magua attack and massacre them. Munro's horse is killed by Magua and falls on top of him, trapping him; Magua tells him that he will kill his daughters and then cuts out his heart. Chingachgook and Uncas free Hawkeye, and they fight their way out of the massacre, taking Cora, Alice, and Heyward via canoe across a lake and downriver. They hide in a cave behind a waterfall, but Magua and the Hurons find them. Before Hawkeye, Uncas and Chingachgook escape by leaping from the waterfall, Hawkeye tells Cora to stay alive and swears that he will find her.

Magua takes his three prisoners to a Huron settlement, with Hawkeye, Chingachgook, and Uncas in pursuit. While Magua is addressing a sachem, Hawkeye walks in unarmed for a parley to plead for their lives. The sachem rules that Heyward is to be returned to the British, Alice be given to Magua for the wrongs done to him by Munro, and Cora be burned alive. Magua is enraged at the sachem's claim that his actions show that his way is not the true Huron way and at his decision about the captives; he storms off with his warriors, taking Alice with them. Although Hawkeye is told he may leave in peace for his bravery, he offers to take Cora's place. Heyward, who is acting as interpreter, instead tells the Hurons to take his own life for Cora's. As Hawkeye is leaving the village with Cora, he shoots Heyward, who is being burned alive, as an act of mercy.

Chingachgook, Uncas, and Hawkeye then pursue Magua's party to rescue Alice. Uncas races ahead on a cliffside path and kills several of the Hurons in combat, but is killed by Magua and thrown off the cliff's edge. Devastated to see Uncas's death, Alice refuses to remain with her captors and commits suicide by jumping off the same cliff. Enraged, Hawkeye and Chingachgook catch up to the Hurons and kill many of them. Hawkeye then holds the rest at gunpoint, allowing Chingachgook to fight and kill Magua himself, avenging Uncas's death. Afterward, with Hawkeye and Cora by his side, Chingachgook prays to the Great Spirit to receive Uncas, proclaiming himself, "the last of the Mohicans".

== Cast ==
- Daniel Day-Lewis as Nathaniel "Hawkeye" Poe
- Madeleine Stowe as Cora Munro
- Russell Means as Chingachgook
- Eric Schweig as Uncas
- Jodhi May as Alice Munro
- Steven Waddington as Major Duncan Heyward
- Wes Studi as Magua
- Maurice Roëves as Colonel Edmund Munro
- Patrice Chéreau as General Louis-Joseph de Montcalm
- Edward Blatchford as Jack Winthrop
- Terry Kinney as John Cameron
- Tracey Ellis as Alexandra Cameron
- Dennis Banks as Ongewasgone
- Pete Postlethwaite as Captain Beams
- Colm Meaney as Major Ambrose
- Mac Andrews as General Webb
- Malcolm Storry as Phelps
- David Schofield as Sergeant Major
- Eric D. Sandgren as Coureur de Bois
- Mark Edrys as Captain Bougainville
- Tim Hopper as Ian
- Jared Harris as British Lieutenant
- Sebastian Roché as Martin

== Production ==
=== Development ===
Michael Mann was said to be "fanatical about the details," causing tension among cast and crew. The project had seen several composers, an editor, and costume designer, James Acheson, walk off production. Daniel Winkler made the tomahawks used in the film, and knifemaker Randall King made the knives.

=== Casting ===
Oglala Lakota activist, musician and writer Russell Means made his film-acting debut as Chingachgook. During filming, he lobbied for the 175 Native American extras to receive better pay and improved lodging conditions.

In preparation for his role, Daniel Day-Lewis and Michael Mann took part in weeks of wilderness training with US Army Special Forces personnel. Daniel Day-Lewis learned to use period weapons, start fires, and hunt and skin game, while other actors took part in additional training. Mann noted that he studied the "18th Century Saber-Fighting Manuals" along with studying old films such as Northwest Passage (1940) and Drums Along the Mohawk (1939).

Through the making of this film, actors Wes Studi and Maurice Roëves became lifelong friends.

=== Filming ===
Although the story takes place in upstate colonial New York, filming was done mostly in the Blue Ridge Mountains of North Carolina. Locations used include Lake James, Chimney Rock Park, and The Biltmore Estate. Some of the waterfalls that were used in the movie include Hooker Falls, Triple Falls, Dry Falls (near Highlands, NC), Bridal Veil Falls, and High Falls, all located in the DuPont State Recreational Forest. Another of these falls was Linville Falls, in the mountains of North Carolina. Also, Hickory Nut Falls at Chimney Rock was in the movie near the end. Scenes of Albany were shot in Asheville, North Carolina at the Manor on Charlotte Street.

The set of Fort William Henry was constructed at a reported cost of US$6 million on felled forestry land (35°47′40.69″N 81°52′12.10″W) adjacent to Lake James in North Carolina. Highway 126, which ran between the set and the lake, had to be closed for the duration of the filming.

== Music ==
The musical score was composed by Trevor Jones and Randy Edelman, with additional cues written by Daniel Lanois. The film features the song "I Will Find You" by Clannad. The main theme of the film is taken from the tune "The Gael" by Scottish singer-songwriter Dougie MacLean.

== Release ==
The film opened in the United States on September 25, 1992, in 1,856 theaters. It was the number-one movie on its opening weekend. By the end of its first weekend, The Last of the Mohicans had generated $10,976,661, and by the end of its domestic run, the film had made $75,505,856 in the United States and Canada. It was ranked the 17th-highest-grossing film of 1992 in the United States. Internationally, the film grossed more than $67 million for a worldwide total over $143 million.

=== Alternate versions ===
When the film was released theatrically in the United States, its running time was 112 minutes. This version of the film was released on Laserdisc in the US on April 7th, 1993 and on VHS in the US on June 23, 1993. The film was later re-edited to a length of 117 minutes, for its US DVD release on November 23, 1999, which was billed as the "Director's Expanded Edition". The film was again re-edited for its U.S. Blu-ray release on October 5, 2010, this time billed as the "Director's Definitive Cut", with a length of 114 mins. All three versions were released on Blu-ray in a Limited Edition set in Austria in 2010.

== Reception ==
On review aggregation website Rotten Tomatoes, the film has a rating of 88% based on reviews from 127 critics, with an average rating of 7.7/10. The site's consensus states, "The Last of the Mohicans is a breathless romantic adventure that plays loose with James Fenimore Cooper's novel – and comes out with a richer action movie for it." On Metacritic, the film holds a weighted average score of 76 out of 100 based on 18 critics. Audiences polled by CinemaScore gave the film an average grade of "A-" on an A+ to F scale.

The Last of the Mohicans opened with critics praising the film for its cinematography and music. Critic Roger Ebert of the Chicago Sun-Times gave the film three stars and called it "quite an improvement on Cooper's all but unreadable book, and a worthy successor to the Randolph Scott version", going on to say, "The Last of the Mohicans is not as authentic and uncompromised as it claims to be – more of a matinee fantasy than it wants to admit – but it is probably more entertaining as a result."

Desson Howe of The Washington Post classified the film as "glam-opera" and "the MTV version of gothic romance". Rita Kempley of the Post recognized the "heavy drama", writing that the film "sets new standards when it comes to pent-up passion", but commented positively on the "spectacular scenery".

=== Historical accuracy ===
The Last of the Mohicans achieves exceptional material accuracy through its highly realistic depiction of the Siege of Fort William Henry and authentic 18th-century regional accents. However, because it adapts James Fenimore Cooper's novel The Last of the Mohicans rather than historical records, its core plotlines and primary characters (like Hawkeye and Magua) are entirely fictional. Some other historical inaccuracies in the movie include inaccurately framing the Mohican people as an extinct nation, and heavily distorting the aftermath of the fort's tragic massacre and falsely showing French General Montcalm approving the ambush and staging the brutal execution of British Colonel Munro, who historically survived the conflict entirely.

=== Awards and nominations ===
Award	Category	Nominee(s)	Result	Ref.
Academy Awards	Best Sound	Chris Jenkins, Doug Hemphill, Mark Smith, and Simon Kaye	Won	
American Cinema Editors Awards	Best Edited Feature Film	Dov Hoenig and Arthur Schmidt	Nominated	
American Society of Cinematographers Awards	Outstanding Achievement in Cinematography in Theatrical Releases	Dante Spinotti	Nominated	
BMI Film & TV Awards	Film Music Award	Randy Edelman	Won	
British Academy Film Awards	Best Actor in a Leading Role	Daniel Day-Lewis	Nominated	
British Academy Film Awards	Best Cinematography	Dante Spinotti	Won	
British Academy Film Awards	Best Costume Design	Elsa Zamparelli	Nominated	
British Academy Film Awards	Best Make-Up	Peter Robb-King	Won	
British Academy Film Awards	Best Original Film Score	Trevor Jones and Randy Edelman	Nominated	
British Academy Film Awards	Best Production Design	Wolf Kroeger	Nominated	
British Academy Film Awards	Best Sound	Simon Kaye, Lon Bender, Larry Kemp, Paul Massey, Doug Hemphill, Mark Smith, and Chris Jenkins	Nominated	
British Society of Cinematographers Awards	Best Cinematography in a Theatrical Feature Film	Dante Spinotti	Nominated	
Chicago Film Critics Association Awards	Most Promising Actor	Wes Studi	Nominated	
Evening Standard British Film Awards	Best Actor	Daniel Day-Lewis	Won	
Golden Globe Awards	Best Original Score	Trevor Jones and Randy Edelman	Nominated	
London Film Critics Circle Awards	British Actor of the Year	Daniel Day-Lewis	Won	
Nastro d'Argento	Best Cinematography	Dante Spinotti	Nominated	
Political Film Society Awards	Peace		Nominated	
Southeastern Film Critics Association Awards	Best Picture		9th Place	
