= Triple Falls (DuPont State Forest) =

Waterfall in North Carolina

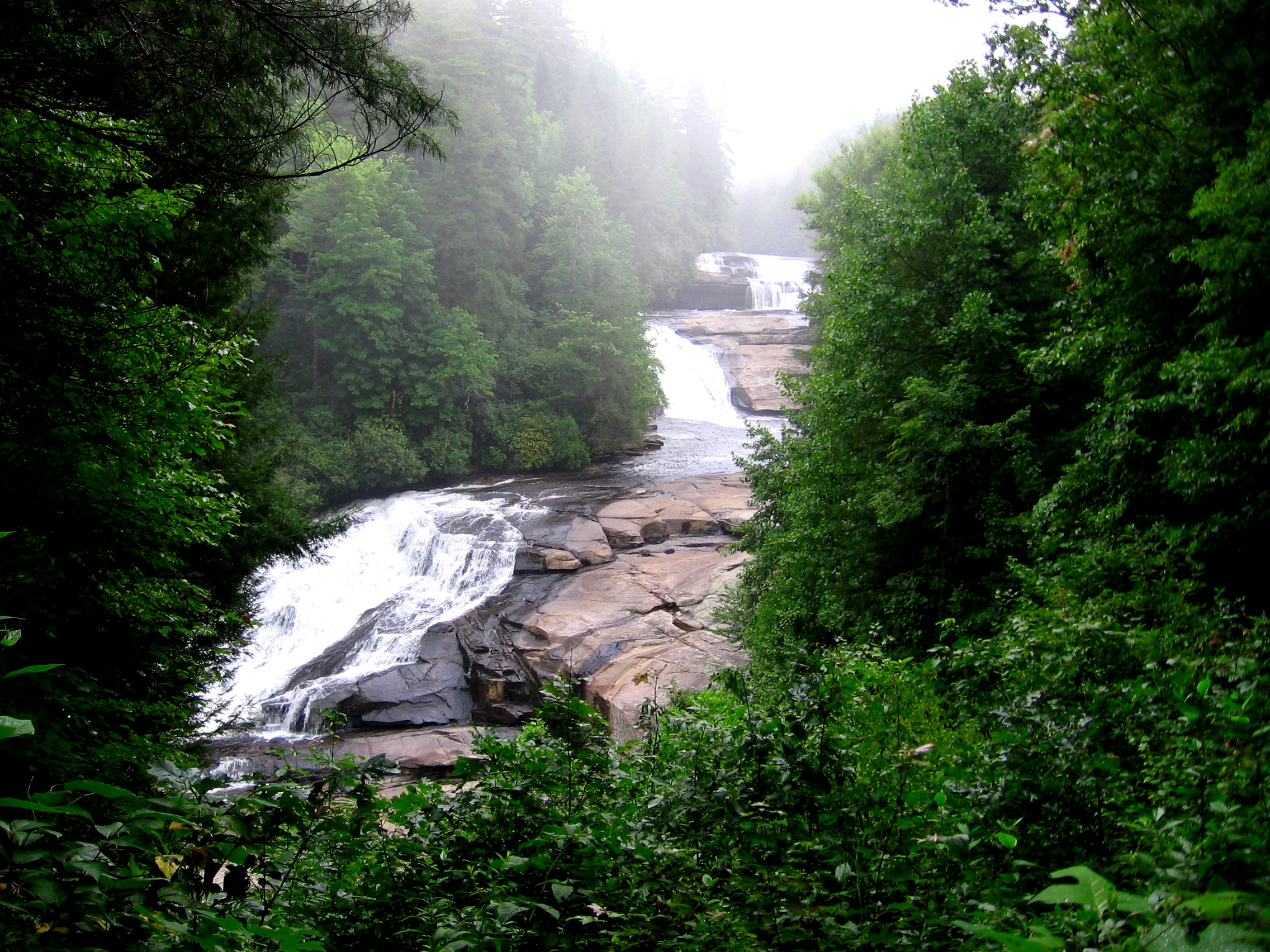
- Triple Falls, Aug 2006
- Interactive map of Triple Falls
- Location: DuPont State Forest, Transylvania County, in the Blue Ridge Mountains of North Carolina
- Coordinates: 35°11′54″N 82°37′01″W
- Type: Tiered, Cascade
- Total height: 125 ft (38 m)
- Number of drops: 3

Triple Falls is a 125-foot (38 m) waterfall located in the DuPont State Forest, southeast of Brevard, North Carolina.

== Geology ==
Triple Falls flows on the Little River through the DuPont State Forest in Transylvania County. It is one of 4 major waterfalls on the Little River in this area, the others being High Falls, Hooker Falls, and Bridal Veil Falls. Triple Falls has 3 distinct, different types of waterfalls.

== History ==
Triple Falls has been known for years to local residents. In the 1990s, DuPont Forest was sold to the State of North Carolina, and as DuPont has completed cleanup of various areas, those areas have been made open to the public. A photograph of Triple Falls was one of the tools used to convince the state to purchase the property, which is now a 10,000-acre (4,047 ha) state forest.

== Visiting Triple Falls ==
Visitors may park at the Hooker Falls parking area, and then hike the Triple Falls / High Falls Trail for roughly 0.5 miles (0.80 km). There are 2 views of the falls, one of the base, where you can only see the bottom falls, and a second upper overlook that lets you view the entire falls.

DuPont State Forest may also allow access to the falls by vehicle to handicapped persons. Contact the DuPont State Forest for more information.

As with all waterfalls, visitors are strongly discouraged from climbing the rocks near the falls. There have been many deaths at Triple Falls.

== Nearby falls ==
- High Falls
- Hooker Falls
- Bridal Veil Falls
- Wintergreen Falls
- Connestee Falls and Batson Creek Falls
- Key Falls
- Glen Cannon Falls
- Turley Falls

== In popular culture ==
The waterfall was also featured in a scene in the films The Last of the Mohicans (1992) and The Hunger Games (2012).

== See also ==
- List of waterfalls
- List of waterfalls in North Carolina
