= The Sentinel (1992 film) =

1992 film

- Film poster
- La sentinelle
- Directed by: Arnaud Desplechin
- Written by: Arnaud Desplechin; Pascale Ferran; Noémie Lvovsky; Emmanuel Salinger
- Produced by: Nicole Arbib; Pascal Caucheteux; Grégoire Sorlat
- Starring: Emmanuel Salinger
- Cinematography: Caroline Champetier; Olivier Chambon
- Edited by: François Gédigier
- Music by: Marc Sommer
- Production companies: Why Not Productions; 2001 Audiovisuel; La Sept Cinéma; Films A2
- Distributed by: Pan-Européenne
- Release date: 20 May 1992
- Running time: 139 minutes
- Country: France
- Language: French
- Box office: $1.4 million

The Sentinel (French: La sentinelle) is a 1992 French thriller film, directed by Arnaud Desplechin. It was entered into the 1992 Cannes Film Festival.

== Cast ==
- Emmanuel Salinger - Mathias Barillet
- Thibault de Montalembert - Jean-Jacques
- Jean-Louis Richard - Bleicher
- Valérie Dréville - Nathalie
- Marianne Denicourt - Marie Barillet
- Jean-Luc Boutté - Varins
- Bruno Todeschini - William
- Philippe Duclos - Macaigne
- Fabrice Desplechin - Simon
- Emmanuelle Devos - Claude
- Philippe Laudenbach - The priest
- László Szabó - Pamiat, the Russian (as Laszlo Szabo)
- Alexis Nitzer - Consul
- Mathieu Amalric - A medical student
- Nadine Alari - Mme. Barillet
- Jean-Pierre Ducos - Customs officer
- Hubert Gillet - Cop on train
- Louis-Do de Lencquesaing

== Accolades ==
Award / Film Festival	Category	Recipients and nominees	Result
Avignon Film Festival	Prix Tournage		Won
Bogotá Film Festival	Silver Precolumbian Circle		Won
Cannes Film Festival	Palme d'Or		Nominated
César Awards	Best First Feature Film		Nominated
César Awards	Best Original Screenplay or Adaptation	Arnaud Desplechin	Nominated
César Awards	Most Promising Actor	Emmanuel Salinger	Won
