= High Falls (DuPont State Forest) =

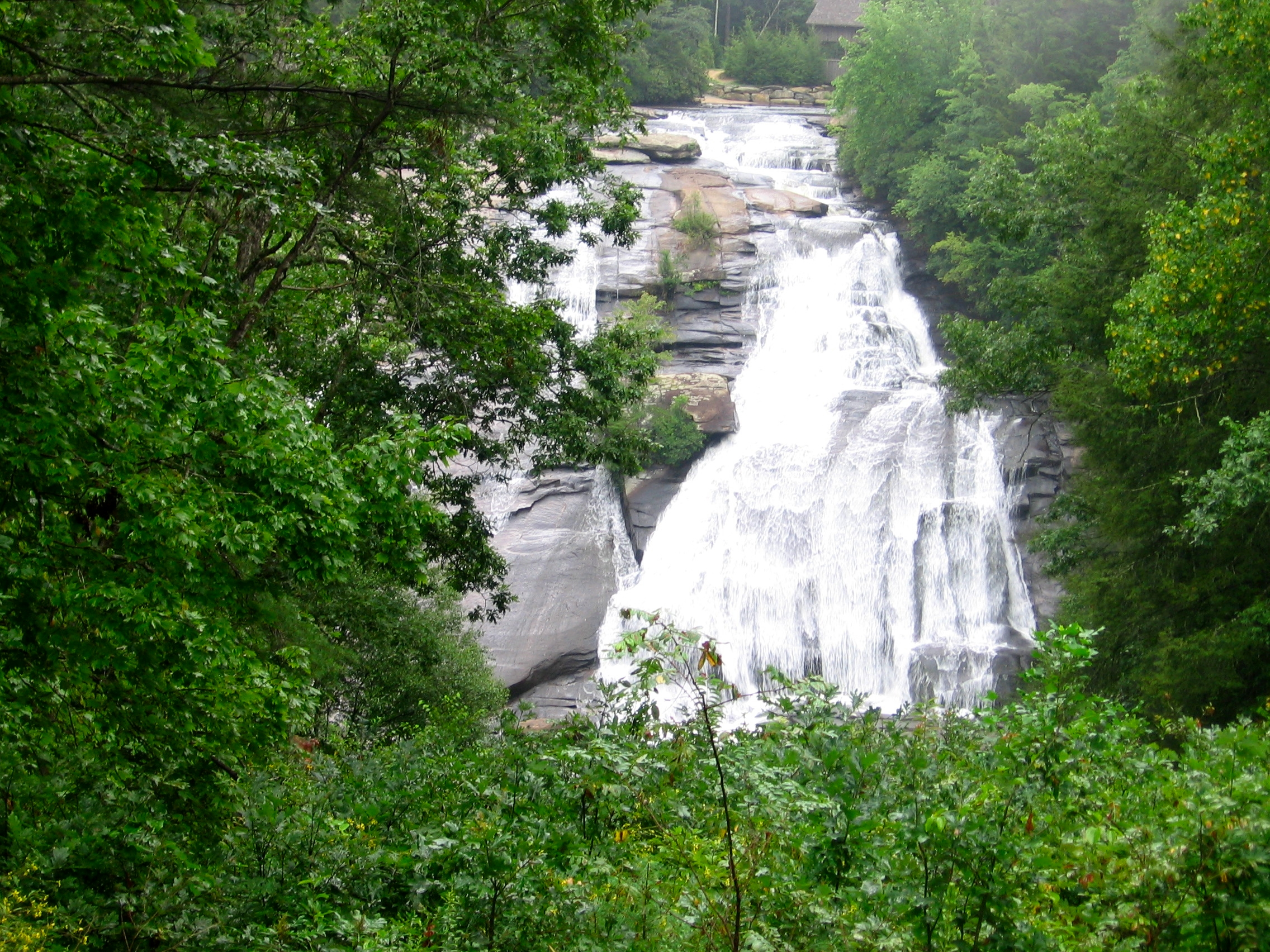
- High Falls, Aug 2006
- Interactive map of High Falls
- Location: DuPont State Forest, Transylvania County, in the Blue Ridge Mountains of North Carolina
- Coordinates: 35°11′35.52″N 82°36′50.52″W
- Type: Cascade, Fan
- Total height: 125 ft (38 m)

High Falls, on the Little River in Transylvania County, is a 125 ft (38 m) waterfall located in the DuPont State Forest, in the Blue Ridge Mountains of North Carolina.

== Geology ==
High Falls is located in Transylvania County on the Little River through the DuPont State Forest. It is one of 4 major waterfalls on the Little River in this area, the others being Triple Falls, Hooker Falls, and Bridal Veil Falls. Above the falls itself, the river is level and calm. The falls consists of a wide, ever-steepening slide over granite, and the water generally stays on the rock the whole way down. In some places, the water free-falls for a few feet or jumps off the rock face, but it is not possible to get behind the falls anywhere.

== History ==
High Falls has been known for years to local residents. In the 1990s, DuPont Forest was sold to the State of North Carolina, and as DuPont has completed cleanup of various areas, those areas have been made open to the public as a part of the 10,000+ acre DuPont State Forest.

== Visiting High Falls ==
Visitors may park at the Hooker Falls parking area, and then hike the Triple Falls / High Falls Trail for roughly 1 mile (past the view for Triple Falls). There are several views of the falls, one from an overlook that lets you view the entire falls, and another from a covered bridge area that passes near the top of the falls on Buck Forest Rd.

DuPont State Forest may also allow access to the falls by vehicle to handicapped persons. Contact the DuPont State Forest for more information.

== Nearby falls ==
- Triple Falls
- Hooker Falls
- Bridal Veil Falls
- Wintergreen Falls
- Connestee Falls and Batson Creek Falls
- Key Falls
- Glen Cannon Falls
- Turley Falls

== See also ==
- List of waterfalls
- List of waterfalls in North Carolina
