= DuPont State Forest =

Protected area in North Carolina, United States

DuPont State Recreational Forest
- IUCN category VI (protected area with sustainable use of natural resources)
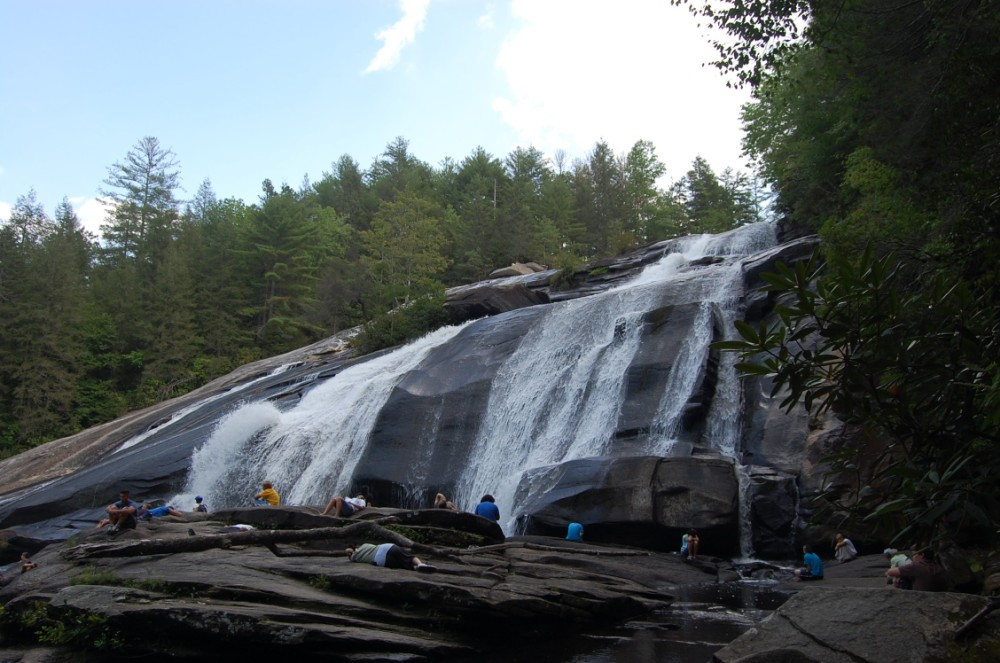
- View of High Falls in DuPont Forest

- Location within North Carolina Location within the United States
- Location: Henderson & Transylvania, North Carolina, United States
- Coordinates: 35°11′49.28″N 82°35′39.5″W
- Area: 12,500 acres (51 km^{2})
- Established: 1997
- Named for: DuPont
- Visitors: 350,000
- Governing body: North Carolina Forest Service
- Website: DuPont State Recreational Forest

DuPont State Recreational Forest, commonly known as DuPont Forest, is a 12,500-acre (5,100 ha) state forest, located in Henderson and Transylvania counties of North Carolina. The name originates from the fact that the DuPont company arranged the sale of the original tract to the state. Adjacent tracts have since been purchased and added to the state forest. Portions of the forest formerly contained a manufacturing facility for the production of X-ray film. The forest was used to shoot scenes from the 1992 film The Last of the Mohicans as well as the 2012 box office hit The Hunger Games. On February 12, 2019, the forest added 402 acres (163 ha) from Conserving Carolina, part of a section called the Continental Divide Tract that connects with other public lands. 314 acres (127 ha) was added to the forest in 2019.

== History ==
Before 1996, the area that is DuPont state forest today, known as Buck Forest, was owned by Dupont, who ran a plant on the property, until it was sold to Sterling Diagnostic Imaging. The remainder of the land was sold to the state of North Carolina, which created DuPont State Forest. However, the original state forest was much smaller than it is today. Later, in 2000, 500 acres (200 ha) were added to the forest.

In 1999, Sterling held a private bid for 2,223 acres (900 ha) out of the 2,700 acres (1,100 ha) the company had acquired. The state and several conservation groups tried to obtain it, but were unsuccessful.

The property was eventually acquired by a developer named Jim Anthony. When the property was sold, Sterling prohibited the land from being used for private development. Anthony stated that he was not planning to develop the property, even though it was obvious based on the improvements he was making to the property. The conservation groups also learned around this time that the restrictions were unenforceable, and that the Landowner could do whatever they wanted with the land.

Despite the efforts of the conservation groups, Anthony continued to develop the property, and eventually divided it into lots. Following this, on October 23, 2000, Governor Jim Hunt and the North Carolina Council of State voted to condemn the property. The state paid Anthony US$24 million for the property, then it was absorbed into DuPont State Forest.

In 2019, Conserving Carolina gave the forest several hundred acres of land in the continental divide tract.

== Recreation ==
Nearly 83 miles (134 km) of multi-use trails and roads thread through the forest. The forest is widely used for many recreational activities, including mountain biking, hiking, horseback riding, swimming (where permitted), wading, and kayaking. Destinations include mountaintop views (such as from the summit of Stone Mountain, and Cedar Rock), lakes (such as Lake Imaging, Lake Julia, Lake Dense, and Fawn Lake), and waterfalls, including:

- Bridal Veil Falls
- Grassy Creek Falls
- High Falls
- Hooker Falls
- Triple Falls
- Wintergreen Falls

Popular mountain biking trails include Ridgeline, Big Rock, Cedar Rock, and Airstrip trails. The Airstrip trail starts from near a small unused (or emergency use) airplane landing area. The Ridgeline trail is particularly noted for its long continuous, winding and uninterrupted run, with a mild downhill grade.

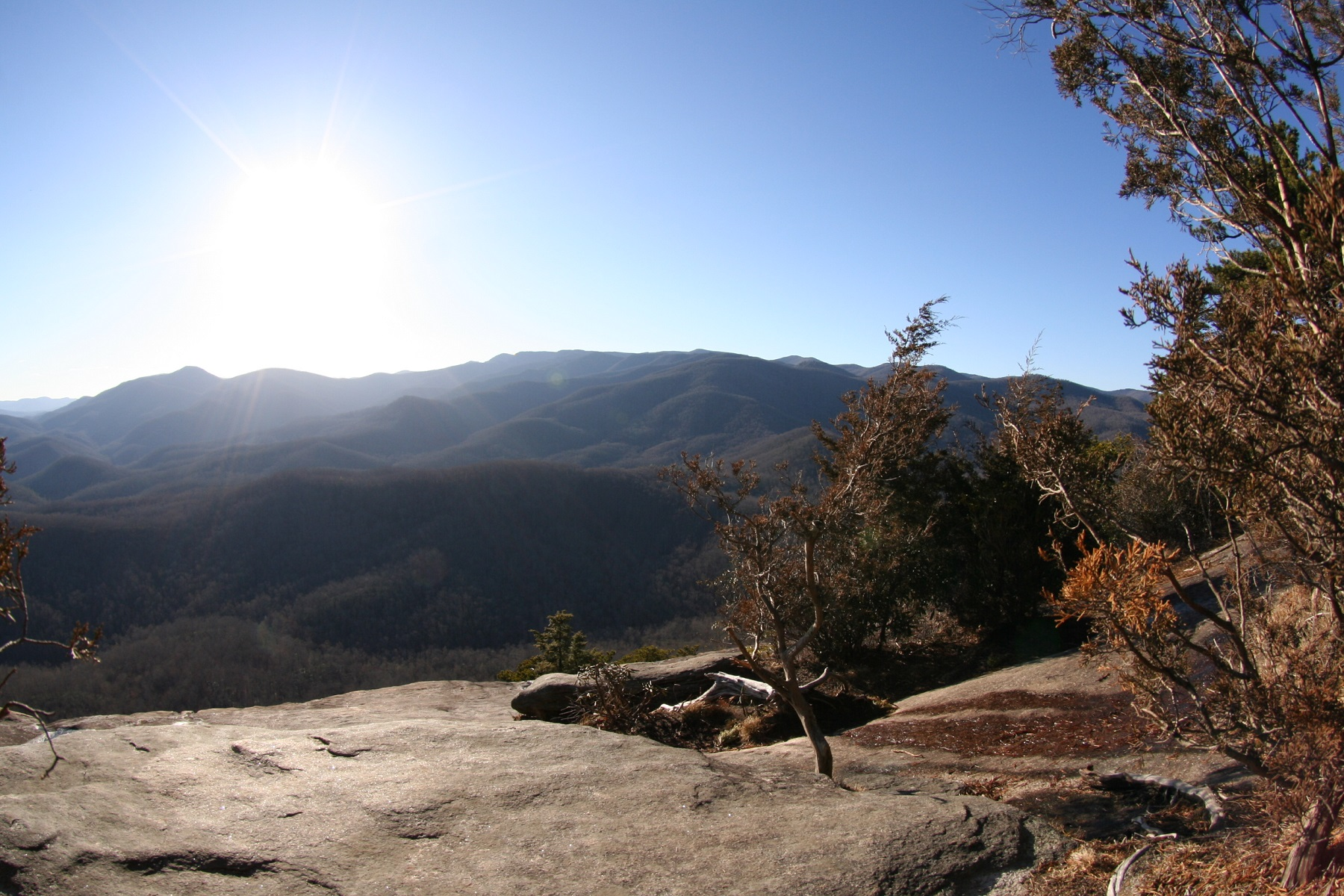
View from "Big Rock"

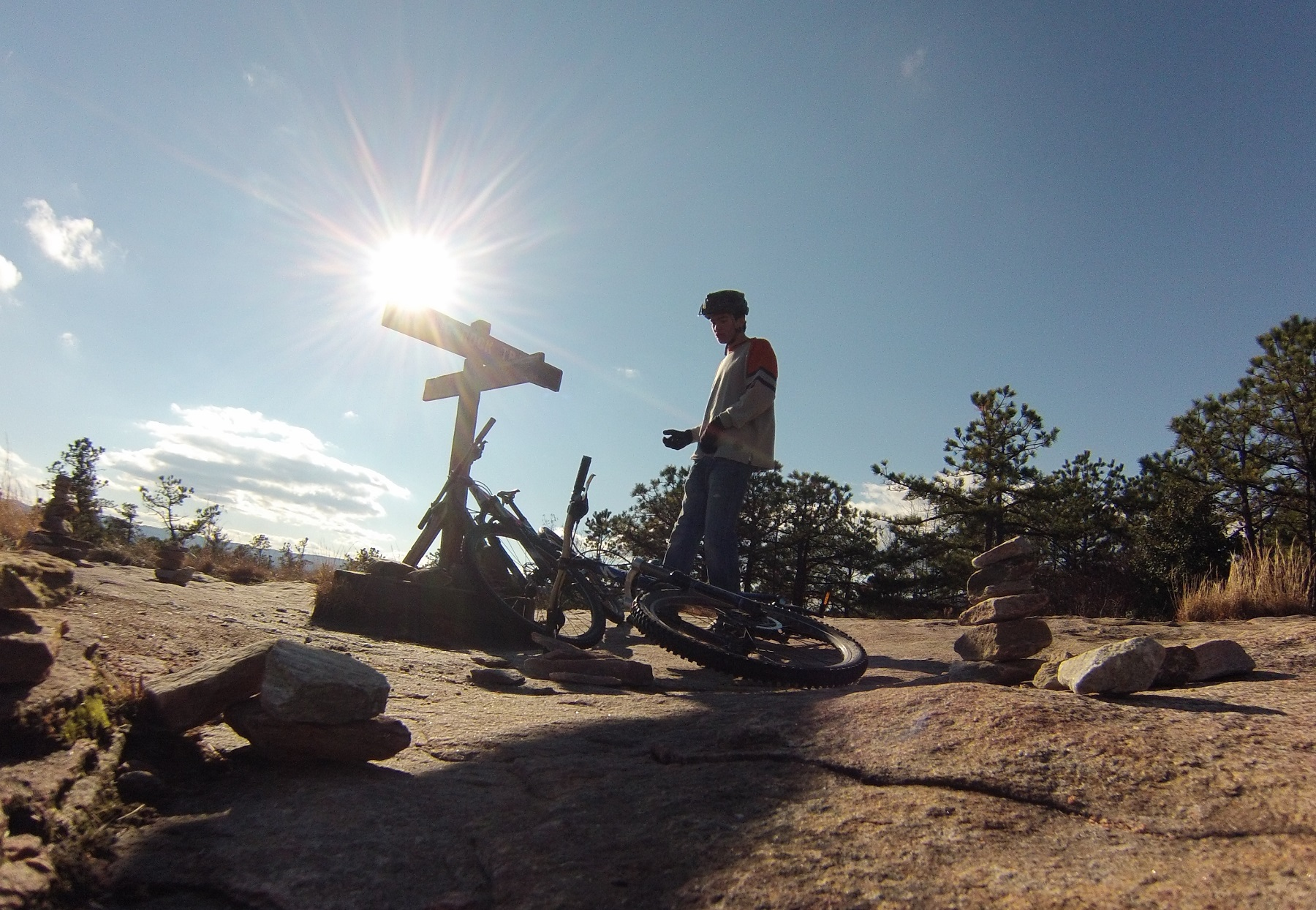
Near Cedar Rock summit (elevation 3,074 feet (937 m)), at intersection of Cedar Rock and Big Rock trails

== Nearby state parks ==
The following state parks and state forests are within 30 miles (48 km) of DuPont State Recreational Forest:

- Caesars Head State Park (South Carolina)
- Chimney Rock State Park (North Carolina)
- Devils Fork State Park (South Carolina)
- Gorges State Park (North Carolina)
- Headwaters State Forest (North Carolina)
- Holmes Educational State Forest (North Carolina)
- Horsepasture State Natural River (North Carolina)
- Jones Gap State Park (South Carolina)
- Keowee-Toxaway State Park (South Carolina)
- Paris Mountain State Park (South Carolina)
- Pisgah View State Park (North Carolina)
- Poe Creek State Forest (South Carolina)
- Table Rock State Park (South Carolina)

== See also ==
- Pisgah National Forest (also popular in western North Carolina for hiking and mountain biking)
- Holmes Educational State Forest (Managed by DuPont State Recreational Forest)
