= Bridal Veil Falls (DuPont State Forest) =

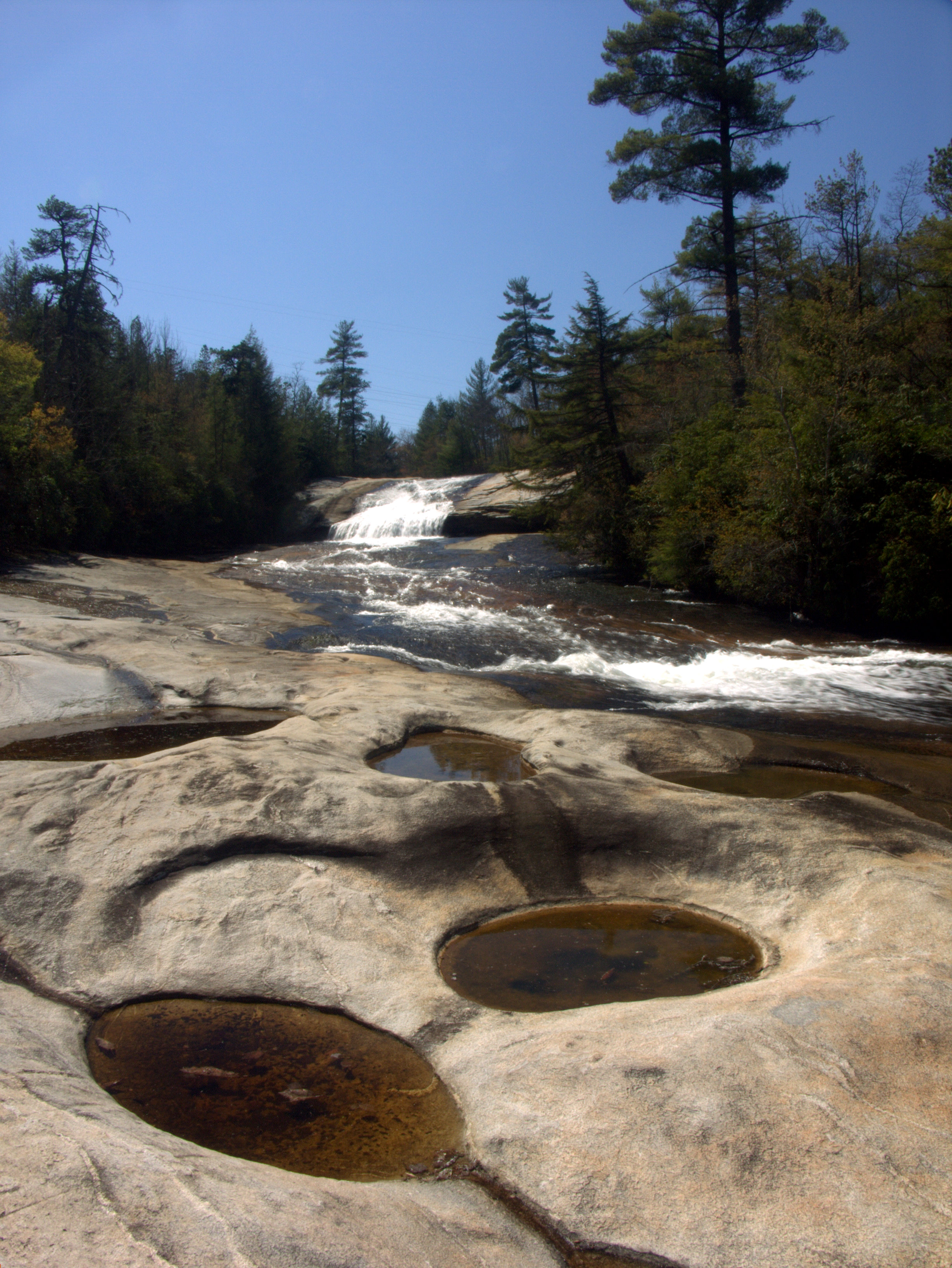
- Top portion of Bridal Veil Falls
- Interactive map of Bridal Veil Falls
- Location: DuPont State Forest, Transylvania County, in the Blue Ridge Mountains of North Carolina
- Coordinates: 35.177122°N 82.621337°W
- Type: Cascade, Slide
- Total height: 120 ft (37 m)

Bridal Veil Falls is a waterfall in the DuPont State Forest, on the Little River, near Brevard, North Carolina.

== Geology ==
The waterfall begins as a slide which drops over a ledge approximately 4 feet (1.2 m) high. The river then continues down a long, sloping, ever-steepening granite slope before plunging into some small pools or against large rock slabs at the bottom. A portion of the river drops off a 25' cascade on river left at the bottom.

Bottom portion of Bridal Veil Falls

== Visiting the falls ==
Access to the falls is from the forest's Fawn Lake parking area by hiking or bicycle by going past Fawn Lake, the airstrip, and the horse barn, or from the Buck Forest parking area by crossing the covered bridge, turning right, and following this road past Lake Julia to the falls. Access to the falls by vehicle may also be allowed for handicapped persons. A wide gravel road travels within several hundred feet of the falls, where a gentle, graveled path descends to the base. There is a viewing platform halfway down this trail and a bike rack at the bottom.

While it is possible to go behind portions of the falls and cross the river, or to walk up the wide, open slab of rock beside the falls when the rock is not wet or slippery, such activities are potentially dangerous. Visitors should exercise caution when crossing any stream or venturing near any waterfall.

== In popular culture ==
The waterfall was featured in scenes in the films The Last of the Mohicans and The Hunger Games.

== Nearby falls ==
- Connestee Falls and Batson Creek Falls
- High Falls
- Hooker Falls
- Key Falls
- Triple Falls

== See also ==
- List of waterfalls
- List of waterfalls in North Carolina
