= Connestee Falls and Batson Creek Falls =

Connestee Falls
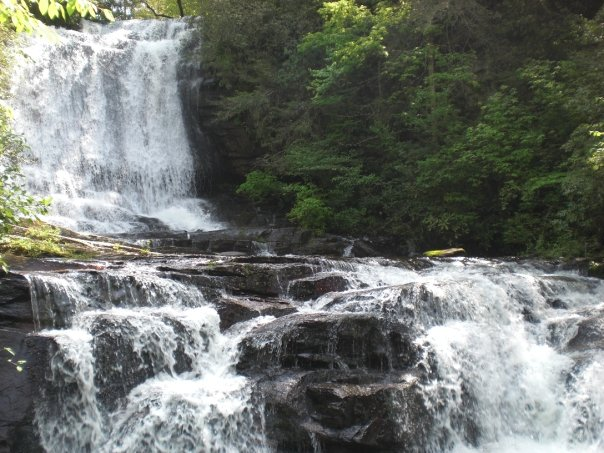
- Connestee Falls
- Interactive map of Connestee Falls
- Location: Transylvania County, North Carolina
- Coordinates: 35.163845°N 82.731428°W
- Type: Tiered Cascade
- Total height: 85 ft (26 m)

Batson Creek Falls
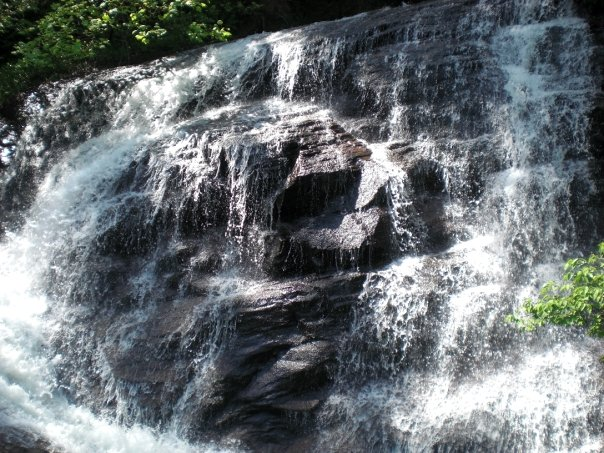
- Batson Creek Falls
- Interactive map of Batson Creek Falls
- Location: Transylvania County, North Carolina
- Coordinates: 35.163845°N 82.731428°W
- Type: Tiered Cascade and Slide
- Total height: 110 ft (34 m)

Connestee Falls and Batson Creek Falls are two waterfalls in Western North Carolina, located near Brevard.

== Geology ==
Batson Creek flows less than 1 mi (1.6 km) from its source, feeding two manmade lakes along the way. It meets Carson Creek at a point where both Batson Creek and Carson Creek fall over bedrock. The falls meet in an area called "The Silver Slip" before continuing on down Carson Creek.

== Natural history ==
The falls were supposedly named for a Native American princess named "Connestee" in 1882 by Dr. F. A. Miles, owner of the Caesar's Head Hotel.

A legend is told that the princess lost her life at the falls due to a relationship with an Englishman.

== Visiting the Falls ==
The falls were recently closed to the public until April 16, 2011, when a new, handicapped accessible, county park was unveiled. The parking lot for the falls is found by traveling on U.S. Highway 276, 6 miles (9.7 km) south of the intersection of 276, U.S. Highway 64, and NC Highway 280 in Brevard, North Carolina. From the viewing platform, you stand at the top of Connestee Falls and watch it just below your feet. In front of you is Batson Falls, which is located on private property within the Connestee Falls Community

== Nearby Falls ==
- High Falls
- Hooker Falls
- Bridal Veil Falls
- Wintergreen Falls
- Triple Falls
- Key Falls
- Glen Cannon Falls
- Turley Falls

== See also ==
- List of waterfalls
- List of waterfalls in North Carolina
