= Key Falls =

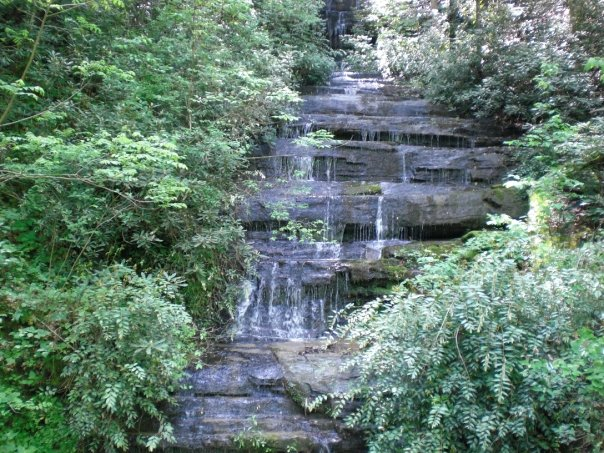
- Key Falls
- Interactive map of Key Falls
- Location: Brevard, Transylvania County, in the Blue Ridge Mountains of North Carolina
- Coordinates: 35°14′57.24″N 82°40′40″W
- Type: Cascade, Tiered Cascade
- Total height: 50 ft (15 m)

Key Falls, is a 50 ft (38 m) waterfall located near Brevard, in the Blue Ridge Mountains of North Carolina.

== Geology ==
Key Falls is a waterfall with a watershed located on an unnamed tributary of the French Broad River. The creek trickles over a series of rocks before continuing on to the French Broad River a few hundred yards downstream.

== Visiting Key Falls ==
The falls is on private property, but the owners allow public access to the falls. The property is owned by Key Falls Inn, a Victorian-style bed and breakfast.

To view the falls, beginning at the intersection of on U.S. Highway 276, U.S. Highway 64, and NC Highway 280 in Brevard, travel east on US 64 for 3.5 miles (5.6 km). Turn right on Crab Creek Road and travel 1.5 miles (2.4 km). Turn right on Everett Road. Travel 2.8 miles (4.5 km) to the driveway for the entrance to Key Falls Inn on the left. You can turn into the Inn's driveway, park, and walk the short path to the falls.

== Nearby falls ==
- Triple Falls
- High Falls
- Hooker Falls
- Bridal Veil Falls
- Wintergreen Falls
- Connestee Falls and Batson Creek Falls
- Glen Cannon Falls
- Turley Falls

== See also ==
- List of waterfalls
- List of waterfalls in North Carolina
