= The Hunger Games (film) =

2012 film by Gary Ross

- Theatrical release poster
- Directed by: Gary Ross
- Screenplay by: Gary Ross; Suzanne Collins; Billy Ray
- Based on: The Hunger Games by Suzanne Collins
- Produced by: Nina Jacobson; Jon Kilik
- Starring: Jennifer Lawrence; Josh Hutcherson; Liam Hemsworth; Woody Harrelson; Elizabeth Banks; Lenny Kravitz; Stanley Tucci; Donald Sutherland
- Cinematography: Tom Stern
- Edited by: Stephen Mirrione; Juliette Welfling
- Music by: James Newton Howard
- Production companies: Lionsgate; Color Force
- Distributed by: Lionsgate
- Release dates: March 12, 2012 (Nokia Theatre); March 23, 2012 (United States)
- Running time: 142 minutes
- Country: United States
- Language: English
- Budget: $78 million
- Box office: $695.2 million

The Hunger Games is a 2012 American dystopian film directed by Gary Ross, who co-wrote the screenplay with Suzanne Collins and Billy Ray, based on the 2008 novel by Collins. It is the first installment of The Hunger Games film series. The film stars Jennifer Lawrence, Josh Hutcherson, Liam Hemsworth, Woody Harrelson, Elizabeth Banks, Lenny Kravitz, Stanley Tucci, and Donald Sutherland. In the film, Katniss Everdeen (Lawrence) and Peeta Mellark (Hutcherson) are forced to compete in the Hunger Games, an elaborate televised fight to the death consisting of adolescent contestants.

Development of a film adaptation of Collins's original novel began in March 2009 when Lionsgate entered into a co-production agreement with Color Force, which had acquired the rights a few weeks earlier. As the novel is written in Katniss's first-person point of view, its screenplay develops ancillary characters and locations for the film. Ross was confirmed as director in November 2010 and the rest of the main cast was rounded out by May 2011. Principal photography began that month and ended that September, with filming primarily taking place in North Carolina.

The Hunger Games premiered at the Nokia Theatre in Los Angeles on March 12, 2012, and was released in the United States on March 23, by Lionsgate. The film received generally positive reviews from critics, with praise for its themes and messages, Jennifer Lawrence's performance, and faithfulness to the source material, although there was some criticism for its use of shaky cam and editing. It grossed $695.2 million, setting the then-records for both the opening day and opening weekend gross for a non-sequel, becoming the ninth-highest-grossing film of 2012.

Among its accolades, the song "Safe & Sound" from the soundtrack, performed by Taylor Swift and The Civil Wars, won a Grammy Award and was nominated for a Golden Globe Award for Best Original Song. For her performance, Lawrence won the Saturn Award for Best Actress, the Broadcast Film Critics Association Award for Best Actress in an Action Movie, the Empire Award for Best Actress, and was also nominated for the New York Film Critics Circle Award for Best Actress. The film has been followed by three sequels: Catching Fire (2013), Mockingjay – Part 1 (2014), and Mockingjay – Part 2 (2015), and two prequels: The Ballad of Songbirds and Snakes (2023) and Sunrise on the Reaping (2026).

== Plot ==
Panem is a dystopian, post-apocalyptic nation based in the former United States divided into twelve districts ruled by the Capitol. As punishment for a failed rebellion 74 years earlier, each district must annually select two tributes, one boy and one girl between the ages of 12 and 18, to fight to the death in the Hunger Games until only one survivor remains. The event is televised nationwide.

Katniss Everdeen lives in District 12 with her younger sister Primrose and her mother. To provide for them, she tends to go beyond the District 12 borders to hunt game at the risk of being caught by Government Peacekeepers. Primrose just came of age and began having night terrors of the event, fearing her name would be drawn. When Primrose is randomly selected at the Reaping for the 74th Hunger Games, Katniss volunteers to take her place. She and her fellow district tribute, Peeta Mellark, are escorted to the Capitol, accompanied by mentor Haymitch Abernathy, the only living victor from their district. Haymitch stresses the importance of gaining sponsors, as they can provide resources during the Games. Katniss manages to impress the sponsors with her bow skills despite her unorthodox tactics, which sparked the ire of her district representative, Effie Trinket, but scored big regardless. During a televised interview, Peeta confesses he loves Katniss, which she initially sees as an attempt to attract sponsors; she later learns his feelings are genuine.

When the Games start, half of the tributes are immediately killed in the initial brawl for supplies around a central structure called the Cornucopia. Katniss grabs a small utility bag and acquires a knife that was thrown at her, then flees into the forest. The career tributes (volunteers from the wealthier Districts 1 and 2 who trained for years for the Games) — Marvel, Glimmer, Cato, and Clove — track her down with Peeta seemingly allied with them, while taking out another tribute. Katniss climbs a tree to evade them. Peeta suggests waiting her out as none of them could climb a tree or shoot her. Hiding in the next tree, Rue, the District 11 girl, draws Katniss's attention to a nest of venomous tracker jackers (genetically modified wasps) above her. Katniss cuts a branch, dropping the nest on the sleeping Careers. Glimmer is killed, but the others escape. Katniss retrieves Glimmer's bow and arrows but is stung with tracker-jacker venom, begins to hallucinate, and witnesses Peeta telling her to flee, during which she has memories of her father being killed in a mining accident.

Later, Rue finds Katniss, helps her recover, warns her of another dead tribute, and they become friends. Rue distracts the Careers while Katniss destroys their stockpile of supplies. Upon returning from the Ruse, Cato kills the tribute in charge of watching the supplies as punishment. Marvel finds and fatally wounds Rue before Katniss shoots him dead. She comforts Rue with song and, after Rue's death, decorates her body with flowers, before giving a three-finger salute. These actions trigger a riot in District 11, greatly displeasing Panem's president, Coriolanus Snow — the Games are designed to dissipate dissent, not focus it — and he warns Seneca Crane, the lead game master of the Hunger Games, to "be careful" and "contain" the situation. Haymitch persuades Crane to allow two victors if they are from the same district, suggesting it would appease the audience.

Katniss finds Peeta severely wounded and hides him in a cave. An announcement is made that one item each survivor needs most will be provided at the Cornucopia. Katniss leaves despite Peeta's protests. She retrieves her item, medicine for Peeta, but is ambushed and pinned by Clove, who gloats about Rue's death. Thresh, District 11's male tribute, appears and kills Clove but spares Katniss just once for having helped Rue. The medicine Katniss brings back heals Peeta's wound overnight.

While hunting, Katniss hears a cannon blast signaling a tribute death. She rushes back to find Peeta, who unknowingly collected deadly nightlock berries. They find Foxface, the District 5 girl, dead from eating the berries after secretly watching Peeta. With only four tributes remaining, Crane unleashes genetically engineered dog-like Mutts, and Thresh is killed off-screen.

Katniss, Peeta, and Cato, the last survivors, flee to the top of the Cornucopia. Cato holds Peeta as a human shield until Katniss shoots his hand with an arrow, enabling Peeta to push Cato down to the Mutts. Katniss then shoots Cato dead in a coup de grâce. Suddenly, Crane revokes the two-victor rule change. Peeta urges Katniss to shoot him, but to deprive the Capitol of a winner, she convinces Peeta that they both eat the nightlock berries. Just before they can, they are declared co-victors.

Later, Haymitch warns Katniss that she has made powerful enemies. Snow has Crane locked in a room containing only nightlock berries as Katniss and Peeta return to District 12.

== Cast ==
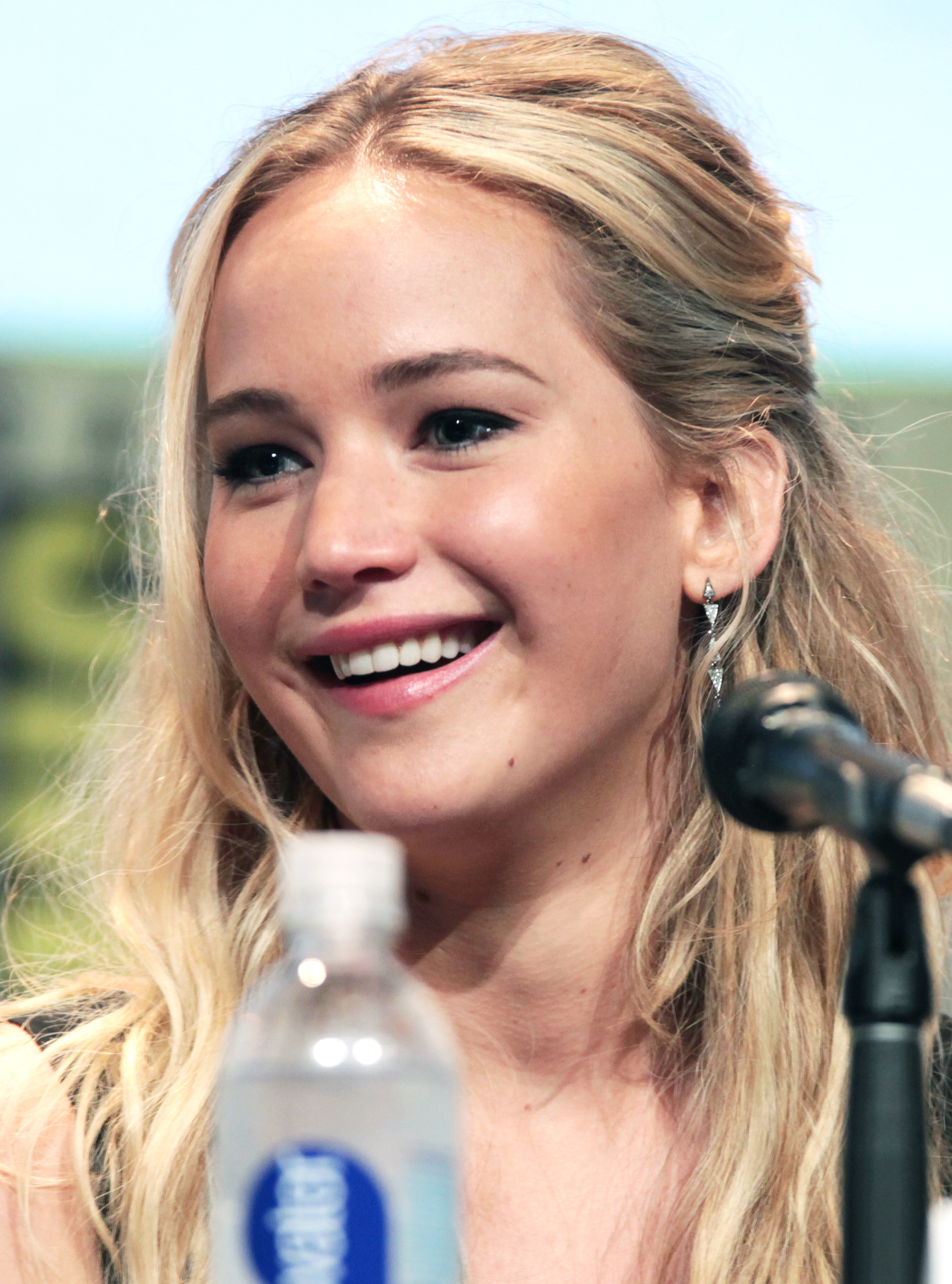
Jennifer Lawrence dyed her hair to play Katniss in The Hunger Games, but wore a wig for Mockingjay Part 1 and 2.

- Jennifer Lawrence as Katniss Everdeen
- Josh Hutcherson as Peeta Mellark
- Liam Hemsworth as Gale Hawthorne
- Woody Harrelson as Haymitch Abernathy
- Elizabeth Banks as Effie Trinket
- Lenny Kravitz as Cinna
- Stanley Tucci as Caesar Flickerman
- Donald Sutherland as President Coriolanus Snow
- Wes Bentley as Seneca Crane
- Toby Jones as Claudius Templesmith
- Alexander Ludwig as Cato
- Isabelle Fuhrman as Clove
- Amandla Stenberg as Rue
- Jacqueline Emerson as Foxface
- Jack Quaid as Marvel
- Leven Rambin as Glimmer
- Dayo Okeniyi as Thresh
- Willow Shields as Primrose Everdeen
- Paula Malcomson as Mrs. Everdeen

== Production ==
=== Development ===
In March 2009, Lions Gate Entertainment (known as Lionsgate) entered into a co-production agreement for The Hunger Games with Nina Jacobson's production company Color Force, which had acquired worldwide distribution rights to the novel a few weeks earlier, reportedly for $200,000 and beating out other competitors including Warner Bros. Pictures, Spyglass Entertainment, and Scott Free Productions. Alli Shearmur and Jim Miller, president and senior vice president of motion picture production at Lionsgate, took charge of overseeing the production of the film, which they described as "an incredible property ... a thrill to bring home to Lionsgate".

The studio, which had not made a profit for five years, raided the budgets of other productions and sold assets to secure a budget of $88,000,000 for the film. Suzanne Collins' agent Jason Dravis remarked that "they [Lionsgate] had everyone but the valet call us" to help secure the franchise. Lionsgate subsequently acquired tax breaks of $8 million for shooting the film in North Carolina. Gary Ross, Sam Mendes, David Slade, Andrew Adamson, Susanna White, Rupert Sanders, and Francis Lawrence (who would later direct the remainder of the film series) were listed as possible directing candidates, but in the end, Ross was announced as the film's director in November 2010. Ross became interested in directing the film after his agent notified him that a film adaptation of The Hunger Games was in development. He knew of the book because his children had read it; he read it quickly and told his agent that he wanted the job.

Ross had many conversations with Collins about how to adapt the story, and was fascinated by how Ancient Roman culture inspired the books. Collins adapted the novel for film herself, in collaboration with screenwriter Billy Ray and Ross. The screenplay remains extremely faithful to the original novel, with Ross saying he "felt the only way to make the film really successful was to be totally subjective", echoing Collins's presentation of the novel in the first person present. Ross felt that, to preserve the novel's first person point of view, the audience could know little more than what protagonist Katniss Everdeen knows about the story's developments. Instead of presenting Katniss's internal monologues about the Capitol's machinations through actual monologues or voice-over narrations, the screenplay expanded on the character of Seneca Crane, the Head Gamemaker, to allow several developments for which Katniss is not present to be shown directly to the audience. Ross explained, "In the book, Katniss speculates about the game-makers' manipulations ... in the film, we can't get inside Katniss's head, but we do have the ability to cut away and actually show the machinations of the Capitol behind the scenes. I created the game centre and also expanded the role of Seneca Crane for those reasons. I thought it was totally important." Ross also added several scenes between Crane and Coriolanus Snow, the elderly President of Panem, noting that "I thought that it was very interesting that there would be one generation [of Panem citizens] who knew that [the Games] were actually an instrument of political control, and there would be a successive generation who was so enamoured with the ratings and the showbiz and the sensations and the spectacle that was subsuming the actual political intention, and that's really where the tension is".

The Gamemakers' control center, about which Katniss can only speculate in the novel, was also developed as a location, helping to remind the audience of the artificial nature of the arena. Ross commented, "so much of the film happens in the woods that it's easy to forget this is a futuristic society, manipulating these events for the sake of an audience. The look of the control center, the antiseptic feeling of it and the use of holograms were all intended to make the arena feel 'constructed' even when you weren't seeing the control room." Ross and visual effects supervisor Sheena Duggal were keen to use the omniscient view that the setting provided to justify the literal dei ex machina Katniss experiences in the arena; Duggal explained that "we really didn't want to have to explain things ... how do you get compelled by these [animals] that just appear at the end of the movie? We wanted to find a way to introduce them without having to explain specifically and exactly what they were and the game room was a really great opportunity for us to be able to do that."

=== Casting ===
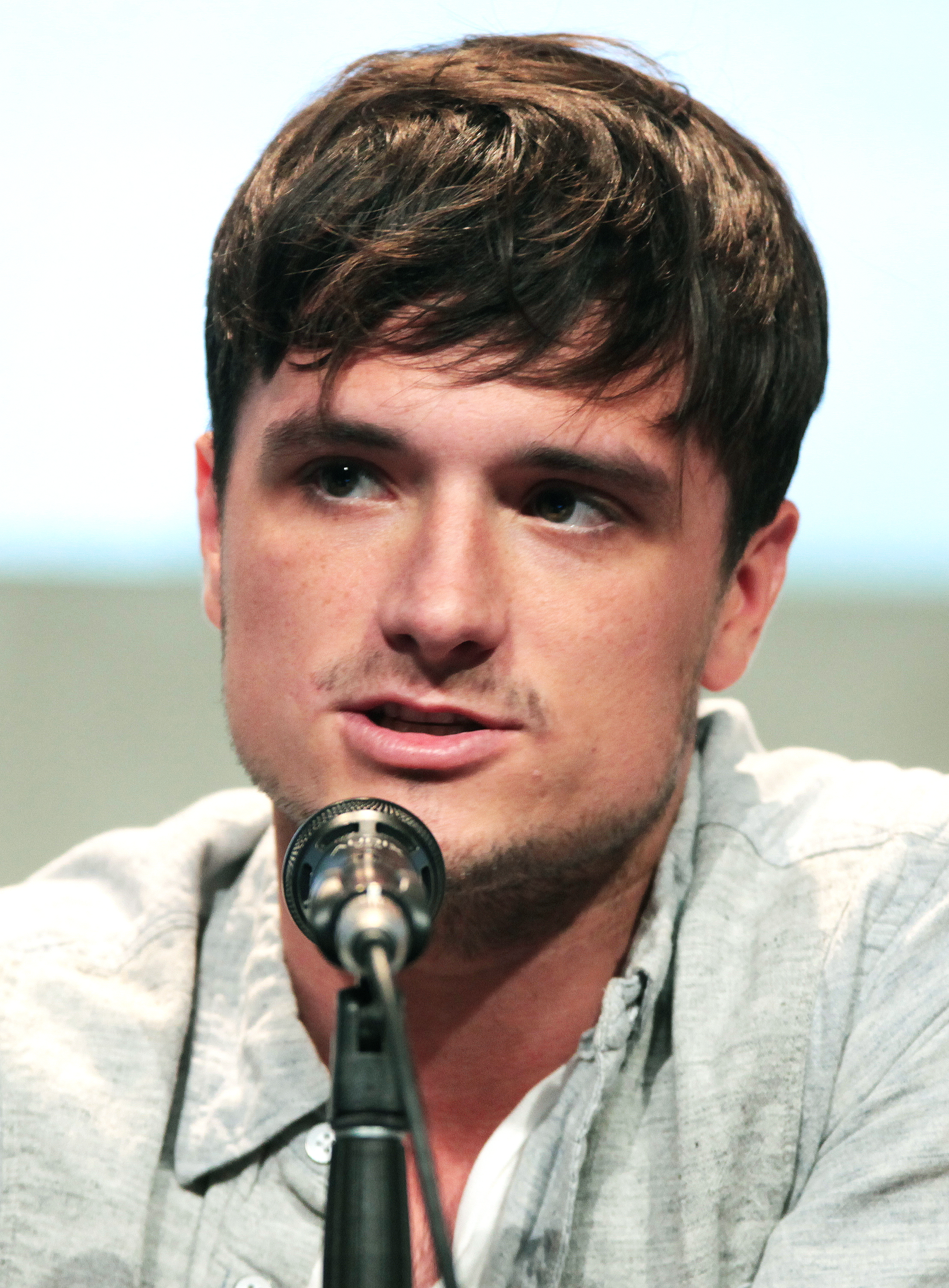
Josh Hutcherson also dyed his hair for the role of Peeta Mellark.

Ross had a general idea of who he wanted to cast in some roles, but the studio insisted on holding auditions for the roles, which he accepted. He found the castings of Katniss Everdeen, Peeta Mellark and Gale Hawthorne "honestly easy". Lionsgate confirmed in March 2011 that about 30 actresses auditioned or read for the role of Katniss Everdeen, including Hailee Steinfeld, Abigail Breslin, Emma Roberts, Alyson Stoner, Mary Mouser, Saoirse Ronan, Chloë Grace Moretz, Jodelle Ferland, Lyndsy Fonseca, Emily Browning, Shailene Woodley, Kaya Scodelario and Troian Bellisario. On March 16, 2011, it was announced that Jennifer Lawrence (who was at the time filming for X-Men: First Class) had landed the role. Feeling that Lawrence "blew the doors off the place", Ross described Lawrence as having "an incredible amount of self-assuredness, you got the sense that this girl knew exactly who she was. And then she came in and read for me and just knocked me out; I'd never seen an audition like that before in my life. It was one of those things where you just glimpse your whole movie in front of you."

Though Lawrence was twenty when filming began, four years older than the character, Collins said that the role demanded "a certain maturity and power" and said she would rather the actress be older than younger. She added that Lawrence was the "only one who truly captured the character I wrote in the book" and that she had "every essential quality necessary to play Katniss". Lawrence, a fan of the books, was originally intimidated by the size of the production, and took three days to accept the role. The producers wanted Lawrence to lose weight for the role, but she refused as she didn't want to become a bad role model for young girls.

Contenders for the role of Peeta other than Josh Hutcherson, included Alexander Ludwig, Hunter Parrish, Lucas Till, Evan Peters, and Austin Butler. Ross felt that Hutcherson was a "pitch perfect". Other actors considered for the role of Gale Hawthorne included David Henrie, Drew Roy and Robbie Amell before Liam Hemsworth was cast. In April 2011, John C. Reilly was in talks with Lionsgate to portray Haymitch Abernathy. The following month, Lionsgate announced that the role had gone to Oscar nominee Woody Harrelson. Harrelson initially passed on the role, but Ross called him up and convinced him to accept the role. The casting of Grammy winner Lenny Kravitz as Cinna, Oscar nominee Stanley Tucci as Caesar Flickerman, and Toby Jones as Claudius Templesmith, soon followed. Tucci and Ross had previously worked together in The Tale of Despereaux, leading Tucci to immediately accept the role of Flickerman when Ross offered it to him in an Italian restaurant of New York City during New Year's Eve. Multiple-Golden Globe Award winner Donald Sutherland was cast as President Coriolanus Snow in late May 2011. Following his casting, Sutherland wrote Ross a letter explaining to the director how much his role meant to the narrative, which impressed Ross and led him to incorporate some of Sutherland's suggestions to Snow's scenes in the film.

=== Filming ===
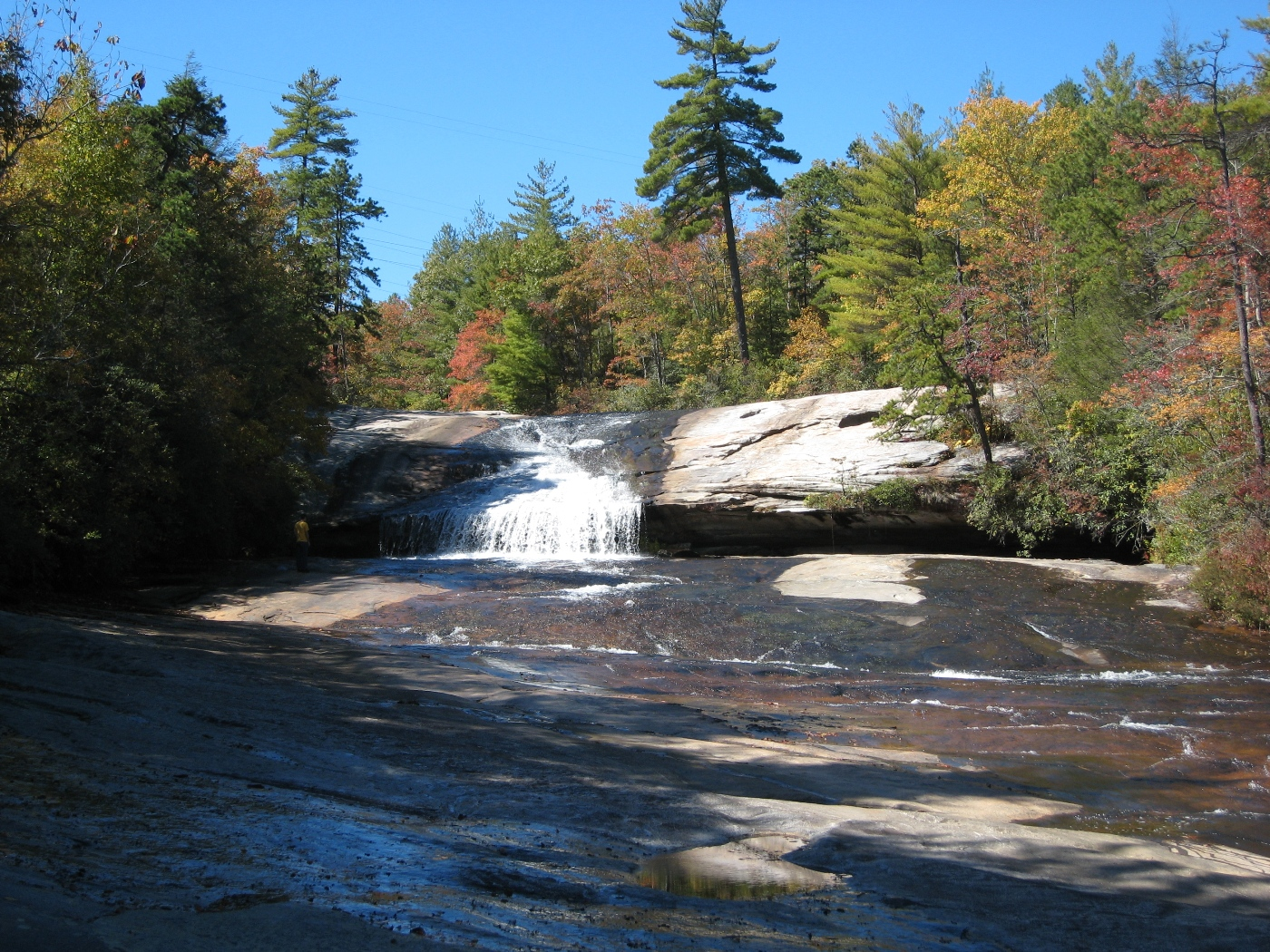
The scene where Katniss tracks down Peeta was filmed at Bridal Veil Falls in DuPont State Forest.

Fireman's Fund Insurance Company insured the production, but as part of the underwriting process, insisted on a thorough risk analysis of hazards as diverse as wayward arrows, poison ivy, bears, bugs and a chase across fast-running water.

Lawrence dyed her naturally blonde hair dark for the part of Katniss. Other stars who dyed their hair for the movie include Josh Hutcherson as Peeta and Liam Hemsworth as Gale. Lawrence also underwent extensive training to get in shape for the role, including archery, rock and tree climbing, combat, running, parkour and yoga. On the last day of her six-week training phase, she had an accident in which she hit a wall while running at full speed, but was not seriously injured. Lionsgate hired Olympic bronze medal-winning archer Khatuna Lorig to teach Lawrence how to shoot.

With an initial budget of $75 million, principal photography began near Brevard in Transylvania County in Western North Carolina in May 2011 and concluded on September 15, 2011, with a final budget reported as between $90 and $100 million, reduced to $78 million after subsidies. Steven Soderbergh served as a second unit director, and filmed much of the District 11 riot scene. The movie was shot on film as opposed to digital, due in part to the tightness of the schedule; as Ross said in an interview with The New York Times, "I didn't want to run the risk of the technical issues that often come with shooting digitally—we simply couldn't afford any delays."

Virtually all production photography took place in North Carolina, with Lionsgate receiving tax credits of around $8 million from the state government to do so. Most outdoor scenes, both from the arena and from the outskirts of District 12, were filmed in DuPont State Forest; the Little River, with its multiple waterfalls, provided several locations for shooting the river running through the arena. To run across Triple Falls, Lawrence was attached to wires and ran on a board.

Many of the urban and interior locations, in the Capitol and elsewhere, were filmed in Shelby and Charlotte; other scenes were filmed in the Asheville area. Ross and production designer Phil Messina drew on the buildings of the 1939 New York World's Fair and symbols of political power including Tiananmen Square and Red Square, when designing the Capitol architecture, which they wanted "to be set in the future but have a sense of its own past ... it's festive and alluring and indulgent and decadent but it also has to have the kind of might and power behind it". For Katniss's neighborhood in District 12, the production team used Henry River Mill Village, an abandoned mill town which Ross said "just worked perfectly for the movie to evoke the scene"; Messina explained that "originally we talked about maybe building one house and the facade of the house next door and redressing it, and maybe doing some CG extensions ... we ended up finding a whole abandoned mill town ... it was absolutely perfect".

For the costume design, Judianna Makovsky and her crew looked at photographs of coal mining districts from the 1950s, in the search of an "American" feel. The idea was to create clothing unique for every character, and to strongly differentiate the people in Capitol and in districts. Grey and blue prevailed in the color palette for the District, while the people in Capitol were chosen to look bright in theatrical hats, flowers, ruffles, with powdered and eyebrowless faces.

== Music ==
=== Soundtrack ===
The soundtrack album for The Hunger Games contains songs inspired by the film; only three of them ("Abraham's Daughter", "Safe & Sound", and "Kingdom Come", respectively) appear in the film itself, during the closing credits. The first single from the film's companion album, "Safe & Sound" by Taylor Swift featuring The Civil Wars, was released on December 26, 2011. Along with separate songs from Swift and The Civil Wars, the soundtrack also features songs by The Decemberists, Arcade Fire, The Secret Sisters, Miranda Lambert featuring The Pistol Annies, Neko Case, Kid Cudi, Academy Award winner Glen Hansard, The Low Anthem, Punch Brothers, Birdy, Maroon 5, Jayme Dee, and Carolina Chocolate Drops. The soundtrack was released on March 20, 2012.

=== Score ===
Danny Elfman and T-Bone Burnett were initially recruited to score music for The Hunger Games, with Burnett also acting as the film's executive music producer to produce songs for the soundtrack. However, due to scheduling conflicts, James Newton Howard replaced Elfman as the music composer. Arcade Fire also contributed to the score album, who composed the fascistic-inspired Panem national anthem, "Horn of Plenty", a leitmotif appearing throughout the film. The score album was released on March 26, 2012.

== Release ==
The film was released in North America and the Netherlands on DVD and Blu-ray Disc on August 18, 2012. Extras include The World is Watching: Making The Hunger Games, numerous featurettes, the propaganda video in its entire form, a talk with the director Gary Ross and also Elvis Mitchell and a marketing archive.

In its first weekend on sale, Lionsgate reported that 3.8 million DVD/Blu-ray Disc copies of the movie were sold, with more than one-third in the Blu-ray Disc format. Three weeks after the release of the movie to home media formats in the US, over 5 million DVD units and 3.7 million Blu-ray Disc units have been sold. With 10,336,637 units sold by the end of the year, it became the top-selling video of 2012. The entire Hunger Games series was released on 4K UHD Blu-Ray on November 8, 2016.

== Reception ==
=== Box office ===
The Hunger Games earned $408 million in the United States and Canada, and $286.4 million in other countries, for a worldwide total of $695.2 million.

In North America, The Hunger Games is the 22nd-highest-grossing film, the highest-grossing film released outside the summer or holiday period, and the highest-grossing film distributed by Lionsgate. Box Office Mojo estimates that the film sold more than 50 million tickets in the US. At the time of its release, the film set a midnight-gross record for a non-sequel ($19.7 million), the tenth-highest midnight gross overall. On its opening day, it topped the box office at $67.3 million (including midnight showings), setting opening-day and single-day records for a non-sequel. The film also achieved the sixteenth-highest opening-day and nineteenth-highest single-day grosses of all time. For its opening weekend, the film earned the No. 1 spot and grossed $152.5 million, breaking Alice in Wonderland's opening-weekend records for a film released in March, for any spring release, and for a non-sequel at the time of its release. On its second day of release, the film had surpassed Fahrenheit 9/11 to become Lionsgate's highest-grossing film worldwide, a record that would later be surpassed by its sequel The Hunger Games: Catching Fire a year later. Its opening weekend gross was the third highest of 2012 behind The Avengers ($207.4 million) and The Dark Knight Rises ($160.8 million) as well as the largest for any film released outside the summer season and the eighth-largest overall. The film held the March and spring opening weekend records for four years until they were broken by Batman v Superman: Dawn of Justice. It remained in first place at the North American box office for four consecutive weekends, becoming the first film since Avatar to achieve this. On June 10, 2012 (its 80th day in theaters), it became the 14th movie to pass the $400-million-mark. On April 20, 2012, Lionsgate and IMAX Corporation announced that due to "overwhelming demand", The Hunger Games would return to North American IMAX cinemas on April 27 for a further one-week engagement.

Outside North America, the film was released in most countries during March and April 2012, with the exception of China, where it was released in June 2012. On its first weekend (March 23–25, 2012), the film topped the box office outside North America with $59.25 million from 67 markets, finishing at first place in most of them. The largest opening weekends were recorded in China ($9.6 million), Australia ($9.48 million), and the UK, Ireland and Malta ($7.78 million). In total earnings, its highest-grossing markets after North America are the UK ($37.3 million), Australia ($31.1 million) and China ($27.0 million).

Also in its release, The Hunger Games broke the record for first-day advance ticket sales on Fandango on February 22, 2012, topping the previous record of The Twilight Saga: Eclipse. The sales were reported to be 83 percent of the site's totals for the day. According to first tracking, unaided awareness for The Hunger Games was 11%, definite interest was 54%, first choice was 23% and total awareness was 74%. In the week leading up to its release, the film sold-out over 4,300 showings via Fandango and MovieTickets.com On Fandango alone, it ranks as the third-highest advance ticket seller ever, behind The Twilight Saga: New Moon and Harry Potter and the Deathly Hallows – Part 2. According to Fandango, it broke the site's single-day sales record (March 23), the mobile sales record for a weekend ( March 23–25, 2012) and the site's highest share of a film's opening weekend (Fandango sold 22% of the film's opening weekend tickets).

=== Critical response ===
The review aggregator website Rotten Tomatoes reported an approval rating of 84% with an average score of 7.3/10, based on 315 reviews. The website's critical consensus reads, "Thrilling and superbly acted, The Hunger Games captures the dramatic violence, raw emotion, and ambitious scope of its source novel." Metacritic, which uses a weighted average, assigned the film a score of 68 out of 100 based on 49 critics, indicating "generally favorable reviews". Audiences polled by CinemaScore gave the film an average grade of "A" on an A+ to F scale.

Several critics have reviewed the film favorably and compared it with other young adult fiction adaptations such as Harry Potter and Twilight, while praising Jennifer Lawrence for her portrayal as Katniss Everdeen, as well as most of the main cast. According to The Hollywood Reporter, Lawrence embodies Katniss, "just as one might imagine her from the novel". Empire magazine said "Lawrence is perfect as Katniss, there's very little softness about her, more a melancholy determination that good must be done even if that requires bad things." Justin Craig of Fox News rated the film as "[e]xcellent" and stated: "Move over Harry Potter. A darker, more mature franchise has come to claim your throne." Rafer Guzman of Newsday referred to The Hunger Games as being "darker than 'Harry Potter,' more sophisticated than 'Twilight'." David Sexton of The Evening Standard stated that The Hunger Games "is well cast and pretty well acted, certainly when compared with Harry Potter's juvenile leads".

Roger Ebert of the Chicago Sun-Times gave the film three out of four, praising the movie as "effective entertainment" and Lawrence's performance. Despite a largely positive review, he criticized the film for being too long and noted that the film misses opportunities for social criticism. Simon Reynolds of Digital Spy gave the film four out of five, calling it "enthralling from beginning to end, science fiction that has depth and intelligence to match its pulse-racing entertainment value". Reynolds also spoke highly of Lawrence's performance and director Gary Ross, whose "rough and ready handheld camerawork" meant that viewers were "with Katniss for every blood-flecked moment of her ordeal in the combat arena". However, film critic David Thomson of the magazine The New Republic called it a "terrible movie", criticizing it for a lack of character development and unclear presentation of the violence, describing the latter as "un-American".

Eric Goldman of IGN awarded the film four out of five, stating that director Gary Ross "gets the tone of The Hunger Games right. This is a grounded, thoughtful and sometimes quite emotional film, with its dark scenario given due weight. Ross doesn't give the film a glossy, romanticized 'Hollywood' feel, but rather plays everything very realistically and stark, as Katniss must endure these outrageous and horrible scenarios." The film received some criticism for its shaky camera style, but it was said to "add to the film in certain ways". The violence drew commentary as well. Time critic Mary Pols considered that the film was too violent for young children, even though the violence had been toned down compared with the novel, while critic Théoden Janes of The Charlotte Observer found that "[...] the violence is so bland it dilutes the message". Also writing in Time, psychologist Christopher J. Ferguson argued that parents' fears of the effect of the film's violent content on their children were unnecessary, and that children are capable of viewing violent content without being psychologically harmed.

=== Interpretation ===
Interpretations of the film's themes and messages have been widely discussed among critics and general commentators. In his review for The Washington Times, Peter Suderman expressed that "[m]aybe it's a liberal story about inequality and the class divide. Maybe it's a libertarian epic about the evils of authoritarian government. Maybe it's a feminist revision on the sci-fi action blockbuster. Maybe it's a bloody satire of reality television", but concludes the film only proposes these theories and brings none of them to a reasonable conclusion.

Reviewers and critics have differing views on whether the film represents feminist issues. Historically, among the "top 200 worldwide box-office hits ever ($350 million and up), not one has been built around a female action star". Manohla Dargis of The New York Times sees Katniss Everdeen as a female hero following in the lineage of "archetypal figures in the literature of the American West" such as Natty Bumppo, as well as characters portrayed by American actors such as John Wayne and Clint Eastwood. Katniss is also seen as defying normative gender roles: she exhibits both "masculine" and "feminine" traits equally. Dargis also notes that Katniss is a female character with significant agency: "Katniss is a fantasy figure, but partly what makes her powerful—and, I suspect, what makes her so important to a lot of girls and women—is that she's one of the truest feeling, most complex female characters to hit American movies in a while. She isn't passive, she isn't weak, and she isn't some random girl. She's active, she's strong and she's the girl who motivates the story." Similarly, Shelley Bridgeman of The New Zealand Herald wrote that because the characteristics of "athleticism, strength, courageousness and prowess at hunting" are not given to a male protagonist, but to Katniss, her character is an abrupt departure from the stereotypical depiction of women as being innately passive or helpless. Mahvesh Murad of The Express Tribune said that the film's triumph is "a young female protagonist with agency", comparing her with Joss Whedon's Buffy Summers.

The film has drawn varying interpretations for its political overtones, including arguments in favor of left-wing, right-wing, and libertarian viewpoints. Bob Burnett of The Huffington Post observed the film displays a general distrust of government, regardless of the audience's political party affiliation. Steven Zeitchik and Emily Rome, in the Dallas Morning News, also stated that some viewers formed an opinion about The Hunger Games as a parable of the Occupy Wall Street activity. The Huffington Post reported that Penn Badgley, a supporter of Occupy Wall Street, saw the film as a social commentary on the movement. Burnett also states that "Collins doesn't use the terms 1 percent and 99 percent, but it's clear that those in the Capitol are members of the 1 percent and everyone in the Panem districts is part of the 99 percent".

Steven Zeitchik and Emily Rome, in the Los Angeles Times and the Dallas Morning News reported that, among other disparate interpretations, some viewers saw The Hunger Games as a Christian allegory. Jeffrey Weiss of Real Clear Religion, published in the Star Tribune, has remarked on what he saw as the intentional absence of religion in The Hunger Games universe, and has commented that, while the stories contain no actual religion, people are "find[ing] aspects that represent their own religious values" within it.

=== Battle Royale and other precedents ===
Several critics compared The Hunger Games unfavorably to Kinji Fukasaku's Japanese film Battle Royale, just as the novel had for its similarities to the novel it was based on by Koushun Takami. Jonathan Looms of The Oxford Student argues that it is "unfair that the film is only drawing comparisons with Battle Royale" but that it "is a veritable pastiche of other movies" as well, comparing it to The Truman Show, Death Race, the Bourne films, and Zoolander, and that it is common for artists to borrow from and "improve on many sources. Quentin Tarantino has built his career on this principle." The Hunger Games is considered to be part of a wider battle royale genre, which had earlier been defined by Battle Royale. Prior to The Hunger Games, the battle royale genre was largely limited to Japan, where Battle Royale had inspired a wave of manga, anime and visual novel works, such as Gantz (2000), Higurashi: When They Cry (2002), Future Diary (2006), Btooom! (2009), Zero Escape (2009) and Danganronpa (2010).

Wheeler Winston Dixon, a film professor at the University of Nebraska–Lincoln, listed several precedents: Battle Royale, Jackson's "The Lottery", William Golding's Lord of the Flies, Metropolis, Blade Runner, Death Race 2000, and George Orwell's Nineteen Eighty-Four. Manohla Dargis in The New York Times compares it to Battle Royale, Ender's Game, and Twilight, but contrasts The Hunger Games in terms of how its "exciting" female protagonist Katniss "rescues herself with resourcefulness, guts and true aim". Steve Rose of The Guardian refers to the film as "think Battle Royale meets The Running Man meets Survivor".

Charles McGrath, writing for The New York Times, said that the film will remind viewers of the television series Survivor, a little of The Bachelorette, and of the short story "The Lottery" by Shirley Jackson, published in 1948 by The New Yorker. It reminded an author at Salon of the 1932 film The Most Dangerous Game. The Hunger Games has also been conceptually compared to Robert Sheckley's 1953 short story "Seventh Victim" and its 1965 Italian film adaptation by Elio Petri, The 10th Victim, as the story and film feature a government-endorsed, televised (in the film's case) "Big Hunt", featuring contestants from around the world acting as "hunters" and "victims". Writing in The Atlantic, Govindini Murty made a list of touchstones the film alludes to, from the ancient Greek, Roman and Egyptian civilizations to modern references such as the Great Depression, the Vietnam and Iraq Wars, and reality television. For her part, author Collins cites the myth of Theseus, the modern Olympic Games, reality television, and coverage of the Iraq War as her inspiration.

=== Controversies ===
==== Race and ethnicity ====
During the film's opening weekend, controversial statements about various members of the cast arose, sparking open dialogue about issues of racism, sexism and unrealistic body image. Comparisons were also made between The Hunger Games premise of children killing each other, and the child soldiers of the Lord's Resistance Army led by Joseph Kony. In a Jezebel article published March 26, 2012, Dodai Stewart reported that several users on Twitter posted racist tweets, criticizing the portrayals of Rue, Thresh and Cinna by African American actors. In a 2011 interview with Entertainment Weekly, Collins stated that while she did not have any ethnic background in mind for lead characters Katniss and Gale because the book is written in "a time period where hundreds of years have passed" and there would be "a lot of ethnic mixing", she explains "there are some characters in the book who are more specifically described", and states that both Rue and Thresh are African American. Lyneka Little of The Wall Street Journal states that although it is easy to find bigoted or offensive postings online, "the racist 'Hunger Games' tweets, because they are so shockingly ignorant even by the standards of the fringes of the internet, have kicked up a storm".

Fahima Haque of The Washington Post, Bim Adewunmi of The Guardian, and Christopher Rosen of The Huffington Post all reiterate the fact that Rue and Thresh are described in The Hunger Games as having dark brown skin, as well as Collins's assertion that they were intended to be depicted as African Americans. Adewunmi remarked that "it comes to this: if the casting of Rue, Thresh and Cinna has left you bewildered and upset, consider two things. One: you may be a racist—congrats! Two: you definitely lack basic reading comprehension. Mazel tov!" Erik Kain of Forbes saw the controversy as a way to appreciate the value of free speech. He states that while society may never be free of racism, "racist comments made on Facebook and Twitter quickly become public record. Aggregations of these comments, like the Jezebel piece, expose people for what they are. Sure, many hide under the cloak of anonymity, but many others cannot or choose not to. And as the internet becomes more civilized and its denizens more accountable, this sort of thing carries more and more weight." Amandla Stenberg responded to the controversy with the following statement: "As a fan of the books, I feel fortunate to be part of The Hunger Games family ... It was an amazing experience; I am proud of the film and my performance. I want to thank all of my fans and the entire Hunger Games community for their support and loyalty." Dayo Okeniyi was quoted saying "I think this is a lesson for people to think before they tweet" and "It's sad ... We could now see where society is today. But I try not to think about stuff like that."

==== Casting of Lawrence ====
A number of critics expressed disappointment in Lawrence's casting as Katniss because her weight was not representative of a character who has suffered a life of starvation. Manohla Dargis, in her review of the film for The New York Times, stated "[a] few years ago Ms. Lawrence might have looked hungry enough to play Katniss, but now, at 21, her seductive, womanly figure makes a bad fit for a dystopian fantasy about a people starved into submission". Todd McCarthy of The Hollywood Reporter said that, in certain scenes, Lawrence displays "lingering baby fat". These remarks have been rebuked by a number of journalists for pushing unrealistic body image expectations for women.

L.V. Anderson of Slate states that, "[j]ust as living in a world with abundant calories does not automatically make everyone fat, living in a dystopian world like Panem with sporadic food access would not automatically make everyone skinny. Some bodies, I daresay, would be even bigger than Lawrence's." Since none of Lawrence's male co-stars have come under the same scrutiny, Anderson concludes that complaints about Lawrence's weight are inherently sexist. MTV asked for responses from audiences on the controversy and reported that most found criticism of Lawrence's weight "misguided". One response pointed to Collins's physical description of Katniss in The Hunger Games novel which reads: "I stand straight, and while I'm thin, I'm strong. The meat and plants from the woods combined with the exertion it took to get them have given me a healthier body than most of those I see around me." Los Angeles Times writer Alexandra Le Tellier commented that "[T]he sexist commentary along with the racist barbs made by so-called fans are as stomach-churning as the film's cultural commentary, which, in part, shines a light on the court of public opinion and its sometimes destructive power to determine someone else's fate".

==== Violence ====
The film has been rated 12A by the British Board of Film Classification (BBFC) in the UK for "intense threat, moderate violence and occasional gory moments". To achieve that rating, Lionsgate had to cut or substitute seven seconds of film by "digitally removing blood splashes and the sight of blood on wounds and weapons." The uncut version was ultimately released on Blu-ray in the UK with a 15 certificate. In the United States, the film was granted a PG-13 rating from the Motion Picture Association of America (MPAA) for "intense violent thematic material and disturbing images—all involving teens"; as Collins had originally anticipated.

Screening of The Hunger Games was delayed indefinitely in Vietnam. The film was to be released on March 30, 2012, but, according to a member of the Vietnamese National Film Board, the Board considers the film to be too violent and unanimously voted for the indefinite delay. It was later banned.

=== Accolades ===
The Hunger Games received fifty-one nominations, and won twenty-eight. The song "Safe & Sound" won a Grammy Award and was nominated for a Golden Globe Award for Best Original Song. For her performance, Lawrence won the Saturn Award and the Empire Award for Best Actress, and the Critics' Choice Awards for Best Actress in an Action Movie. The film itself received twelve nominations, winning the award for Favorite Movie at the People's Choice Awards and at the Kids' Choice Awards. Meanwhile, Hutcherson won a MTV Movie Award for Best Male Performance, a Teen Choice Award for Choice Movie Actor – Sci-Fi/Fantasy and a Do Something! Awards for Best Male Movie Star, and Elizabeth Banks won the MTV Movie Award for Best On-Screen Transformation.

== Sequels and prequels ==
On August 8, 2011, while still shooting the film, Lionsgate announced that a film adaptation of the second novel in The Hunger Games trilogy, The Hunger Games: Catching Fire, was scheduled to be released on November 22, 2013. In November 2011, Lionsgate entered negotiations with screenwriter Simon Beaufoy to adapt the novel for screen, since the post-production schedule for The Hunger Games was too crowded for Ross and Collins to adapt the next film as originally planned. The Hunger Games: Catching Fire began production in the summer of 2012. Gary Ross did not return for Catching Fire, and instead Francis Lawrence directed the film. On May 6, 2012, it was reported that Michael Arndt was in talks to re-write the script for Catching Fire. Arndt officially signed on as the new script writer on May 24, 2012. The Hunger Games: Catching Fire began filming September 10, 2012, and concluded December 21, 2012; it premiered in London on November 11, 2013, before premiering on November 22, 2013, in the US as was originally scheduled.

In July 2012, release dates were confirmed for two films based on Mockingjay, the final novel of the original series. The Hunger Games: Mockingjay – Part 1 was released on November 21, 2014, followed by Part 2 on November 20, 2015. Jennifer Lawrence, Hutcherson, Hemsworth, and Harrelson were all signed on to the whole franchise.

Collins wrote two further books preceding the original series, The Ballad of Songbirds and Snakes and Sunrise on the Reaping. These were also adapted into films by Lionsgate, with Francis Lawrence returning to direct. The Hunger Games: The Ballad of Songbirds & Snakes was released on November 17, 2023, and The Hunger Games: Sunrise on the Reaping was released on November 20, 2026.
