= Savage Nights =

- Theatrical release poster
- Directed by: Cyril Collard
- Written by: Cyril Collard; Jacques Fieschi
- Produced by: Nella Banfi
- Starring: Cyril Collard; Romane Bohringer; Carlos López
- Cinematography: Manuel Teran
- Edited by: Lise Beaulieu
- Music by: René-Marc Bini; Cyril Collard
- Distributed by: Pan Européenne Distribution
- Release dates: 21 October 1992 (France); 20 March 1993 (U.S.); 18 June 1993 (UK)
- Running time: 126 minutes
- Country: France
- Language: French
- Box office: $662,341 (USA)

Savage Nights (French: Les Nuits fauves) is a 1992 French drama film directed and written by Cyril Collard. It stars Collard, Romane Bohringer, and Carlos López. The film is an adaptation of Collard's semi-autobiographical novel Les Nuits fauves, published in 1989. It won four César Awards, including Best Film.

== Plot ==
“I feel I go through life like an American tourist, doing as many towns as possible", explains Jean, a camera man and aspiring film director. Handsome but self-centered, childish, and hedonistic, he has a complicated sex life. He is bisexual and HIV positive. During a casting session he meets Laura, a lively, seventeen-year-old aspiring actress. Captivated by her charm, Jean soon is pursuing her and she quickly falls in love with him. They start a passionate affair. At the same time, the restless Jean pursues a relationship with Samy, a young rugby player. Samy, who has emigrated with his mother and brother from Spain, is unemployed and equally troubled. He is straight and although living with his girlfriend, Marianne, he has no qualms about his homoerotic relationship with Jean, who has a big crush on him.

Jean and Laura's relationship is complicated by him having HIV, which initially he hides from her. Only after they have had sex does he tell her. At first, Laura is furious and her mother is equally livid. However, Laura is by then deeply in love with Jean. She not only continues the relationship but also refuses to use condoms as Jean wanted.

Jean is also deeply troubled in accepting his disease. "Drop your illusions. Learn from your disease", suggests his friend Noria. Peaceful acceptance does not come easy for him; his life ricochets from one coupling to the next, trying to make sense of his situation. He is a damned rebel, which he defines as "Someone marked by fate and with real dignity inside".

Laura has emotional problems too; at one point she erupts at the owner of the dress shop where she works and loses her job. Her feelings reach a boiling point in dealing with Jean's bisexuality, which involves not only Jean's relationship with Samy but anonymous sex with multiple partners in dark cruising spots. In these sex encounters, Jean releases his self-destructive drive and finds refuge from the frustrations brought by his illness and his affairs with Laura and Samy.

As Samy acquires a taste for sadomasochism and violence, he turns to Jean. He moves in with him, leaving Marianne, who angrily berates Jean. After a fight with racist skinheads, Samy finally consummates his relationship with Jean and tells him that he loves him. Laura turns increasingly angry and desperate, disappointed in her relationship with Jean. "Help me to leave you!" is her pathetic cry. Jean is emotionally closed. After a night out of drinking and partying Jean yells "I want to live" to his friends but mostly he seems in denial that he is dying. The next morning Laura finds him in bed not only with Samy but with his ex-girlfriend. Laura throws a big tantrum and from then on, she leaves endless, long messages on Jean's answering machine. In some she begs for love, in others she threatens to ruin his life.

Reaching the breaking point, Laura threatens Jean with committing suicide and tells him that he has infected her with HIV. Only then, Jean intervenes and with Laura's mother they find psychological help for her. Jean repeatedly fails to find meaning in his life. A conversation with his mother is only painful. Returning home, he is involved in a car accident. He is as reckless in his sex life as with his HIV medication, which he avoids when it interferes with his drinking and partying.

After some time, Jean looks again for Laura. He finally wants to tell her that he loves her but she has overcome her turbulent relationship with him. Making peace with herself, Laura has a new boyfriend. Jean and Laura have a short conversation, they kiss tenderly and part ways. Jean finally finds peace with his HIV status and with his life.

== Cast ==
Collard was not his own first choice for Jean, but the actor he choose ended up in prison before the set, so he took the role. Collard's longtime companion, Corine Blue, plays the role of Laure's mother in the film.

- Cyril Collard as Jean
- Romane Bohringer as Laura
- Carlos López as Samy
- Corine Blue as Laura's Mother
- Claude Winter as Jean's Mother
- René-Marc Bini as Marc
- Maria Schneider as Noria
- Clémentine Célarié as Marianne
- Laura Favali as Karine
- Jean-Jacques Jauffret as Pierre Olivier
- Aïssa Djabri as Kader
- Francisco Giménez as Paco
- Marine Delterme as Sylvie
- Diego Porres as Jaime
- Stephan Lakatos as Jipe
- Christophe Chantre as Martial
- Michel Voletti as Mr. André
- Régine Arniaud as Véro
- Olivier Chavarot as Olivier
- Samir Guesmi as Jamel
- Claudio Zaccai as Doctor
- Dominique Figaro as Camille

== Reception ==
Released in October 1992, Savage Nights caused an immediate stir across France where it had 2,811,124 admissions and was the 9th highest-grossing film of the year. It went on to take four César Awards (Best Film, Best First Film, Best Editing, and Best Female Newcomer – Romane Bohringer) in March 1993—three days after its writer/director/star died of AIDS.

== Year-end lists ==
- Top 10 (listed alphabetically, not ranked) – Matt Zoller Seitz, Dallas Observer
- Top 10 runner-ups (not ranked) – Janet Maslin, The New York Times
- Honorable mention – Betsy Pickle, Knoxville News-Sentinel

== Director's view ==
"AIDS, like tuberculosis in Thomas Mann's The Magic Mountain, is just a backdrop [in Savage Nights]. Jean's struggle with the illness is also a struggle with stupidity, with all sorts of racism, with tyranny... Jean acts as though nothing were different in his daily life. He continues to drink, laugh, and drive fast. In his own way, he is shattering the taboos. He does not let himself get locked into the status of being HIV-positive, like some people for whom the illness becomes a sort of identity card."

– Cyril Collard, writer/director/actor, Savage Nights

== DVD release ==
Savage Nights is available in Region 2 DVD. It was released in France.
