= Cyril Collard =

French author, filmmaker, composer, musician and actor

Cyril Collard (French: [kɔlaʁ]; 19 December 1957, Paris − 5 March 1993, Versailles) was a French author, filmmaker, composer, musician and actor. He is known for his unapologetic portrayals of bisexuality and HIV in art, particularly his autobiographical novel and film Les Nuits fauves (Savage Nights). Openly bisexual, Collard was also one of the first French artists to speak openly about his HIV-positive status.

== Early life ==
Collard was born into a liberal, middle-class family in France. He attended Lycée Hoche in Versailles, and pursued an engineering degree at Institut Industriel du Nord in Villeneuve d'Ascq, later known as École centrale de Lille before deciding to drop out.

== Books ==
- Condamné amour (1987)
- Les Nuits fauves (1989; trans. Savage Nights by William Rodarmor, 1993)
- L'Ange sauvage (1993)
- L'Animal (1984)

== Les Nuits fauves (film) ==
The semi-autobiographical Savage Nights (Les Nuits fauves), finished in 1992, was Collard's first and only feature film. It won four César Awards (best editing, best film, best first work, and most promising actress) in 1993. Unfortunately, Collard did not live to accept his award; he had died three days earlier.

== Other directing credits ==
Early in his career, Collard assisted fellow director Maurice Pialat and directed six music videos, as well as several television programs. Among the music videos he directed were those of French-Algerian band Carte de Séjour, whose lead singer Rachid Taha was one of the most famous rock musicians of colour in France.

- Les raboteurs, short film after painting by Caillebotte; choreography by Angelin Preljocaj, music by Thierry Lancino (1988).

== AIDS ==
Collard's own experiences with AIDS undoubtedly influenced his work. He died of an AIDS-related illness, aged 35.

== Sources ==
- Entry in glbtq encyclopedia
- biography at Yahoo! Movies
