= La Crise =

1992 French film

- Directed by: Coline Serreau
- Written by: Coline Serreau
- Produced by: Alain Sarde
- Starring: Vincent Lindon; Patrick Timsit; Zabou Breitman; Michèle Laroque
- Cinematography: Robert Alazraki
- Edited by: Catherine Renault
- Music by: Sonia Wieder-Atherton
- Distributed by: AMLF
- Release date: 1992
- Running time: 95 minutes
- Country: France
- Language: French
- Box office: $14.1 million

La crise (French: The Crisis), is a 1992 French film written and directed by Coline Serreau.

== Synopsis ==
Victor is a legal advisor who finds himself abandoned by his wife and fired the same day. He tries to seek comfort from different friends and family members, but everyone he meets is concerned with their own problems. His morale begins to falter when he realizes that no one cares about him. He meets Michou, a simple but clingy homeless man, who is the only person to listen to him.

Victor gradually realizes that his own egocentric attitude is responsible for the lack of consideration from those close to him, and he slowly adopts a different attitude. He hires Michou as his assistant, though the latter is less than competent. In the final scene, Victor finds his wife, who had wanted to get away from him for a while, and the film ends with doubts that their relationship will continue.

Through the successive dialogues between the different protagonists that Victor meets, the film addresses various themes such as modern medicine and the overconsumption of drugs, blended families, adultery, racism, junk food, and the fear of old age.

== Cast ==
- Vincent Lindon as Victor Barelle
- Patrick Timsit as Michou
- Zabou Breitman as Isa Barelle
- Yves Robert as M. Barelle
- Annick Alane as Mamie
- Michèle Laroque as Martine
- Didier Flamand as Monsieur Laville
- Clotilde Mollet as Tania
- Laurent Gamelon as Didier
- Maria Pacôme as Madame Barelle
- Gilles Privat as Laurent
- Christian Benedetti as Paul
- Nanou Garcia as Sophie
- Robinson Stévenin as Borin's son

== Awards and nominations ==
List of awards and nominations
Year	Award	Category	Recipient	Result
1993	César Awards	Best Original Screenplay or Adaptation	Coline Serreau	Won
1993	César Awards	Best Film	Coline Serreau	Nominated
1993	César Awards	Best Actor	Vincent Lindon	Nominated
1993	César Awards	Best Supporting Actor	Patrick Timsit	Nominated
1993	César Awards	Best Supporting Actress	Maria Pacôme	Nominated
1993	César Awards	Best Supporting Actress	Michèle Laroque	Nominated
1993	César Awards	Best Supporting Actress	Zabou Breitman	Nominated
1993	Festival de Gramado	Best Editing	Catherine Renault	Won
1993	Festival de Gramado	Best Latin Film	Coline Serreau	Nominated
1994	Peñíscola Comedy Film Festival	Best Film	Coline Serreau	Won
