= Elsa Zamparelli =

American costume designer (born 1944)

- Born: Marie Johanna Elizabeth Vande Bovenkamp; December 8, 1944 (age 81)
- Occupation: Costume designer
- Years active: 1982-present
- Spouse: Robert G. Zamparelli (August 12, 1968-1985) Steve Kenneth Irish (August 10, 1991-present)

Elsa Zamparelli (born December 8, 1944) is a costume designer who is best known for her work on Dances with Wolves and The Last of the Mohicans, though British designer James Acheson designed most of the film before leaving the production.

She was nominated at the 63rd Academy Awards for Best Costumes for her work on Dances with Wolves.

== Selected filmography ==
- The Order (2001)
- Ace Ventura: When Nature Calls (1995)
- Last of the Dogmen (1995)
- The Last of the Mohicans (1992)
- Dances with Wolves (1990)
