= Mark Smith (sound engineer) =

American sound engineer

- Occupation: Sound engineer
- Years active: 1987-2006

Mark Smith is an American sound engineer who won an Oscar for Best Sound for the film The Last of the Mohicans. He worked on nearly 100 films and television shows from 1987 to 2006.

== Selected filmography ==
- The Last of the Mohicans (1992)
