= Little River (North Carolina) =

Little River may refer to ten streams by that name in the U.S. state of North Carolina:

- Little River (Albemarle Sound tributary), a tributary of Albemarle Sound forming a portion of the border between Pasquotank and Perquimans counties.
- Little River (Cape Fear River tributary), a tributary of the Cape Fear River rising in Moore County. This river forms a portion of the boundary between Moore and Hoke counties and between Cumberland and Harnett counties.
- Little River (Eno River tributary), a tributary of the Eno River rising in Orange County and entering the Eno River in Durham County.
- Little River (French Broad River tributary), a tributary of the French Broad River in Transylvania County.
- Little River (Horry County, South Carolina), a river in South Carolina that grazes the North Carolina border before entering the Atlantic Ocean in South Carolina.
- Little River (Jacob Fork tributary), a tributary of the Jacob Fork of the Catawba River in Burke County.
- Little River (Neuse River tributary), a tributary of the Neuse River
- Little River (North Carolina-Virginia), a tributary of the New River rising in Alleghany County, North Carolina, and flowing through Grayson County, Virginia. Note: The New River has another, larger tributary further downstream in Virginia also called the Little River (New River tributary).
- Little River (Pee Dee River tributary), a tributary of the Pee Dee River that flows through Randolph, Montgomery, and Richmond counties.
- Little River (Roanoke River tributary), a former tributary of the Roanoke River, now submerged by Lake Gaston.
