= The Cloisters in popular culture =

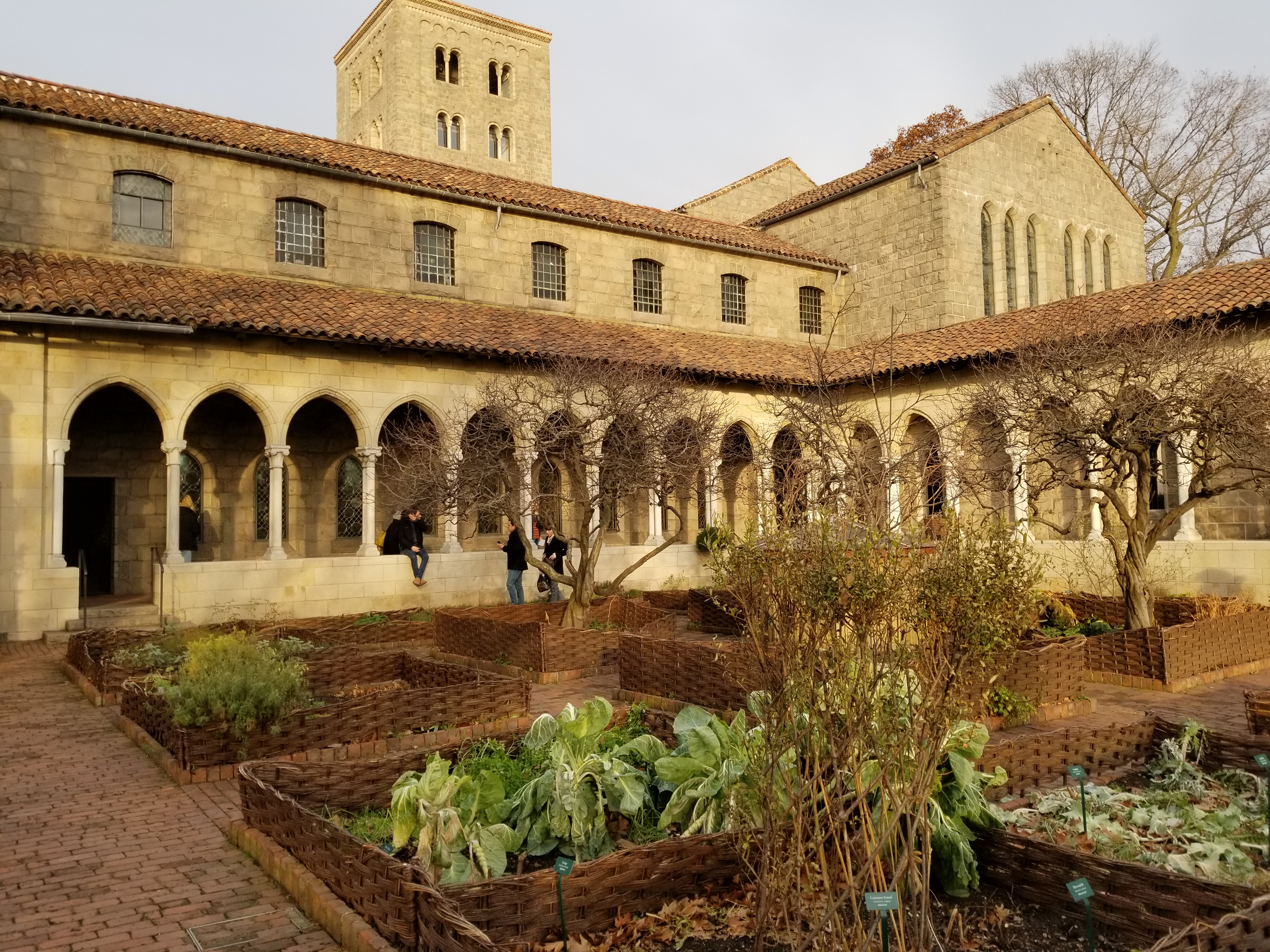
Bonnefont Garden at the Cloisters

The Cloisters is a branch of New York City's Metropolitan Museum of Art, which houses the institution's collection of Medieval art. Located in Fort Tryon Park in Upper Manhattan, The Cloisters opened in 1938. It has been featured and referenced in many works of popular culture since then.

== Literature ==
- 1950 – Several chapters of Frederick Buechner's novel, A Long Day's Dying, are set in The Cloisters.
- 1953 – A 12th century sculpture from The Cloisters collection carries a curse which causes the death of a Ziegfeld girl in Russell Janney's So Long As Love Remembers.
- 1955 – A kiss in the Heather Garden of Fort Tryon Park and a visit to The Cloisters are memories which resonate throughout Herman Wouk's novel Marjorie Morningstar.
- 1982 – In Nancy Garden's novel for young adults Annie on My Mind, the lead characters spend time together in The Cloisters; it is an especially meaningful location for the title character.
- 1994 – James Morrow's Towing Jehovah has its protagonist meet the Archangel Raphael after taking a ritual bath in the Cux Cloister fountain at midnight.
- 2002 – Richard Powers' The Year of Our Singing is set in The Cloisters.
- 2002 – The main character in James Lasdun's The Horned Man visits the Unicorn Tapestries to find the meaning of a growth on his head.
- 2003 – In The Bone Vault by Linda Fairstein, the body of a Cloisters research assistant is found inside an Egyptian sarcophagus.
- 2003 – The main character of Han Nolan's novel When We Were Saints meets a Southern boy who she believes shares her spiritual power. She takes him to live in The Cloisters, where the birchwood statue of the "Enthroned Virgin and Child" from Autun, France causes a dispute between them.
- 2006 – In Mary Pope Osborne's children's book Blizzard of the Blue Moon, the main characters. Grinda and Balor, are sent back to 1938, the year The Cloisters opened, in order to free the unicorn from the Unicorn Tapestries.
- 2007 – In Gregor and the Code of Claw, the final book in Suzanne Collins' Underland Chronicles, the main character Gregor remembers visiting the Cloisters, and compares himself to a statue of a knight lying on top of a sarcophagus.
- 2007 – In When Day Breaks by Mary Jane Clark, a murder investigation revolves around the theft of a unicorn amulet, and ends with a deadly fall off the ramparts of The Cloisters.
- 2010 – A fog which passes through The Cloisters brings to life a manticore in the Narbonne arch door which attacks the narrator of Lee Carroll's Black Swan Rising. ("Lee Carroll" is Carol Goodman and Lee Slonimsky.)
- 2011 – In C.C. Humphreys' young adult novel The Hunt of the Unicorn the protagonist is pulled into the "Unicorn in Captivity" tapestry during a school field trip, and ends up in a fantasy world with a unicorn named Moonspill.
- 2012 – The Autun "Enthroned Virgin and Child" creates a strong bond between the narrator and a dead friend in Carol Rifka Brunt's Tell the Wolves I'm Home.
- 2017 – In Carol Goodman's young adult novel The Metropolitans, set in The Cloisters, a carved stone basilisk from the Narbonne arch doorway features in the plot.
- 2018 – In The Cloister, James Carroll tells the story of two relationships that are linked together across 800 years.
- 2019 – In The Toll, the third book of the Arc of a Scythe series by Neal Shusterman, many chapters are set in The Cloisters.
- 2022 – In The Cloisters, Katy Hays follows a curatorial associate working a summer job at The Cloisters.

== Poetry ==
- 1961 – Leonard Cohen published The Spice Box Of Earth, a collection of poems including "The Unicorn Tapestries".
- 1946 – The Unicorn Tapestries inspired poet Anne Morrow Lindbergh to writes a series of poems published in The Unicorn and Other Poems 1935–1955.
- 1981 – Jorge Luis Borges' poem "The Cloisters", from La Cifra presents the sense of timelessness that resonates in The Cloisters.

== Comics ==
- 1980 – Spider-Man dueled the Rapier in The Cloisters.
- 2008 – Nightwing becomes the curator of the museum, which he closes for "renovations" for several months, while in actuality using its offices as his base of operations, having sent home the entire staff.

== Film ==
- 1948 – In the film Portrait of Jennie, directed by William Dieterle and starring Joseph Cotten, Jennifer Jones and Ethel Barrymore, The Cloisters was used as the location for a convent school.
- 1948 – Maya Deren, an experimental filmmaker, utilized the ramparts of The Cloisters and the view of The Palisades for her short film Meditation on Violence.
- 1976 - 2000 – In the films The Front (directed by Martin Ritt, 1976), The Devil's Own (Alan J. Pakula, 1997), and Keeping the Faith (Edward Norton, 2000), characters visit the gardens of The Cloisters as a place to get away from the city and their problems.
- 1968 – Two scenes in Coogan's Bluff, starring Clint Eastwood, were filmed in Fort Tryon Park, including a shoot-out at The Cloisters and a motorcycle chase in the Heather Garden.
- 1994 – The film Amateur by Hal Hartley used The Cloisters as the home of a nun (Isabelle Huppert) who writes adult fiction.
- 1996 – The Cloisters was used as a setting for Looking for Richard, Al Pacino's documentary about performing William Shakespeare's play Richard III.
- 2009 – In Julio Depietro's romantic comedy The Good Guy, a young couple sneaks into the Bonnefont Cloister for a romantic candlelit evening.
- 2021 – In Steven Spielberg's remake of West Side Story, Tony (Ansel Elgort) takes Maria (Rachel Zegler) to The Cloisters on a date.

== Television ==
- 1994 – In season 1, episode 7 of the animated TV series Gargoyles ("Temptation", first broadcast on November 11, 1994), the gargoyles Demona and Brooklyn of the Manhattan Clan fight at The Cloisters.
- 2009 - In the third episode of the third season of Mad Men, a secretary named Olive tells Peggy, a fellow secretary and protagonist of the episode, that her husband and she had planned to "drive up to the cloisters".

== See also ==
- The Unicorn Tapestries in popular culture
