= Gregor and the Marks of Secret =

2006 book by Suzanne Collins

- The cover of the first edition.
- Author: Suzanne Collins
- Language: English
- Series: The Underland Chronicles
- Genre: Fantasy
- Publisher: Scholastic
- Publication date: 1 May 2006
- Publication place: United States
- Media type: Print (paperback)
- Pages: 352 pp
- ISBN: 0-439-79145-6
- OCLC: 62172584
- LC Class: PZ7.C6837 Gpk 2006
- Preceded by: Gregor and the Curse of the Warmbloods
- Followed by: Gregor and the Code of Claw

Gregor and the Marks of Secret is an epic fantasy children's novel by Suzanne Collins. It is the fourth book of The Underland Chronicles and was first published by Scholastic in 2006. It picks up soon after the end of Gregor and the Curse of the Warmbloods. The protagonist, Gregor, joins Luxa on a quest to discover what is happening to the mysteriously disappearing population of mice.

== Plot summary ==
The novel opens with Gregor's little sister Lizzie preparing to go to camp, while Gregor and Boots head down to the Underland. Ripred introduces Gregor to the now-teenaged Pearlpelt so Gregor can observe "the Bane's" violent instability, and choose to kill him before he ends up in a leadership position. Gregor is uncomfortable with the idea. The next day, he returns to dissuade Ripred, but is instead attacked by the Bane's friends.

After several more weeks, Ripred is still missing, but Gregor remains relaxed until a messenger unexpectedly delivers Luxa her crown. Luxa and her friends know that this is a distress call from the nibbler colony in the Jungle. They investigate, but discover only a deceased mouse and an abandoned colony. Luxa is distraught, and decides to visit the nibblers' other colony at the Fount, under the pretense of going on a picnic date. This ruse leads to several others coming along as well. The group finds the colony mysteriously deserted, though they do discover a "mark of secret" which Hazard says warns of death and sorrow. The traveling party tracks the mice into the Swag, but are forced into Hades Hall by an earthquake. During their journey back to Regalia, they learn the Bane has been systematically executing nibblers, which leads Luxa to declare war against all gnawers. Gregor becomes annoyed with Luxa as the consequences of her actions become apparent.

The team eventually locates the missing nibblers, trapped by rats in a natural gas chamber, and is shocked to discover an Underland children's song describes the scene perfectly (and is thus yet another of Bartholomew of Sandwich's dreadful prophecies). A volcano starts to erupt nearby, and all rush to escape. Though one of their number dies in the explosion, the group travels sadly on until they exit the Firelands. Once there, they part ways: Gregor, Ares, and Temp going to escort the young and injured back to Regalia and spread the news of the rats' plans; the rest returning to protect and mobilize any remaining nibblers. Gregor wants to join the latter group, but Ripred convinces him to go learn about the "Prophecy of Time" and finally claim Sandwich's sword. Ripred also helps Gregor realize his new romantic feelings for Luxa, which have kept him moody and confused during their entire journey. The novel ends with Gregor accepting his role as Sandwich's "warrior" by claiming his sword, and training for war.

=== The Prophecy of Secret ===
The prophecy in this book is carved into the walls of an old nursery in the Regalian Palace. The Underlanders take it for a popular nursery rhyme of sorts, like Hey Diddle Diddle or Humpty Dumpty. Underland children sing and dance to it at parties, as Gregor discovers in the early chapters of the novel. Unlike the rest of Sandwich's prophecies, it is not known to be such at the beginning of the book.

When the characters witness the mass death of a group of nibblers, and Boots' dancing mimics the terrifying scene perfectly, they reevaluate the nursery rhyme as a prophecy. They find it describes the extermination of the nibblers, and it is dubbed the "Prophecy of Secret" by Aurora.

== Characters ==
=== Quest members ===
- Gregor: The twelve-year-old protagonist of the novel; a "rager" and the Regalians' "warrior". He is bonded to the flier Ares and is a close friend of the princess Luxa. The knowledge that he will soon be leaving the Underland forever causes him to conflict with many of his friends, when they act as though he will never leave.
- Ares: A large black flier (bat) bonded to Gregor. He is brave and much stronger than the average bat. During the journey, he is a source of strength for the other quest members with his calm and resourcefulness.
- Luxa: The rebellious future queen of Regalia. During the period between Gregor and the Prophecy of Bane and Gregor and the Curse of the Warmbloods, she and her bond Aurora were trapped in the Jungle and became close friends with the nibbler colony there. It is that colony's request for help that motivated her, Aurora, Gregor, and Ares to begin their quest. She later makes the "Vow to the Dead" at the site of a nibbler mass execution, essentially pledging all her personal and political power to avenge the mice's deaths.
- Aurora: A golden bat bonded to Luxa. She is one of Ares's only friends. She tends to side with Luxa in arguments, particularly on the subject of the mice colonies, as they were great friends to her as well.
- Boots (Margaret): Boots is Gregor's two-year-old sister. She is known as "the princess" by the crawlers. She becomes fixated with an Underland children's song that is later determined to be one of Bartholomew of Sandwich's sinister prophecies in disguise.
- Hazard: Luxa's young halflander cousin. He gifted with languages, and also has unusual knowledge about life in the Jungle, which makes him a great asset to the quest group. He turns seven early in the novel. He and the young flier Thalia are very close friends. Hazard sustains a head wound immediately after the traveling party enters the Swag and is incapacitated for most of the trip.
- Thalia: A very young peach-colored female bat. She absolutely loves jokes, and the other quest members often try to get her to laugh when she is terrifies by the number of dangerous circumstances they encounter on their way back to Regalia. She dies in the eruption of "the Queen" volcano, because she is too slow to outfly the volcanic ash and too inexperienced to hold her breath while flying. Ares, who blames himself for being unable to carry her away fast enough, lays her to rest with some mice recently executed by rats.
- Howard: Luxa's capable older cousin, and a kind of older brother to her. Howard is training to become a doctor, and is remarkably tolerant towards other creatures, with the notable exception of shiners (whom he blames for the near-death of Luxa and Aurora).
- Nike: A black-and-white striped bat, the daughter of Queen Athena. She becomes close to Howard, who lost his bond Pandora during a previous quest. Like Howard, she also dislikes fireflies.
- Temp: A crawler and friend of Boots. He is not very good at speaking English (which leads many to look down on him somewhat), but he is patient and wise, and has finely tuned natural instincts which save the quest members several times.
- Ripred: A grizzled old rat, and a rager like Gregor. The questers find him trapped in a slick obsidian pit with his teeth locked together, a form of slow execution and torture ordered by the Bane. He journeys with them out of the Firelands and provides valuable insight into the gnawers' reasons for exterminating the nibblers.
- Cartesian: A nibbler from the Fount colony whom the questers encounter early on. He is the sole survivor of his colony and is both terribly injured and suffering from an acute stress reaction (or "shock"). During brief moments of lucidity, he reveals himself to be brave and intelligent, but he spends most of the trip delirious from pain medication.
- Photos Glow-Glow and Zap: Two hired fireflies who travel briefly with the quest members as a source of light, after their displaced colony is discovered in Hades Hall. They desert the group at the first sign of danger.

== Publication ==
Gregor and the Marks of Secret was first published by Scholastic on May 1, 2006. An audiobook version was released by Listening Library on May 13, 2008, read by Paul Boehmer. It has been translated into German, Spanish, French, Chinese, and Polish.

== Reception ==
Gregor and the Marks of Secret was a New York Times bestseller and a Book Sense bestseller.

The book has been positively reviewed by critics. Horn Book Magazine praises the pacing and character development, and School Library Journal calls the drama "intense". A Kirkus starred review notes that in this book "Collins begins to gather herself for the grand finale" and praises the "cliffhanger ending".
