= The Cloisters (disambiguation) =

The Cloisters is a museum in New York dedicated to medieval European art and architecture.

The Cloisters may also refer to:

== Buildings ==
- The Cloisters (Letchworth), a listed building in Hertfordshire, England
- The Cloisters (Lutherville, Maryland), an historic house in the US
- The Cloisters, Adelaide, part of the University of Adelaide, South Australia
- The Cloisters, Perth, a building in Western Australia, Australia
- The Cloisters, Salisbury, a public house in Salisbury, Wiltshire, England

== Other uses ==
- The Cloisters (novel), a novel by Katy Hays

== See also ==
- Cloister, a covered walk, open gallery, or open arcade
- Cloister (disambiguation)
