= Gregor and the Code of Claw =

2007 book by Suzanne Collins

- Cover of the first edition.
- Author: Suzanne Collins
- Cover artist: Daniel Craig
- Language: English
- Series: The Underland Chronicles
- Genre: Fantasy
- Publisher: Scholastic
- Publication date: 2007
- Publication place: United States
- Pages: 416
- ISBN: 978-0-439-79144-1
- OCLC: 66527121
- Preceded by: Gregor and the Marks of Secret

Gregor and the Code of Claw is a children's novel by author Suzanne Collins, best known for her Hunger Games trilogy. It is the fifth and final book of The Underland Chronicles, and was published in 2007. The novel has been praised as a conclusion to The Underland Chronicles. The Kirkus Reviews observed, "The resolution is bittersweet but faintly hopeful—a fitting end for an unflinchingly gutsy series whose deftly drawn characters have always lived dangerously." An audiobook version was released in 2008 read by Paul Boehmer.

== Plot summary ==
Only a few hours have passed since the ending of Gregor and the Marks of Secret, when Gregor returns from the Firelands to warn Regalia of an impending gnawer attack. As the novel opens, Gregor is numb with shock from the Prophecy of Time's apparent prediction of his death. He and his bond Ares disobey Solovet and return to the Firelands to find the terribly ill Luxa, Aurora, and Howard. Gregor rushes his ill friends back to the city for treatment, whereupon Solovet orders him locked in the dungeon for insubordination. He is eventually released by Nerissa to help his sister Boots while the toddler works to fulfill the Prophecy of Time by deciphering the rats' "Code of Claw".

Solovet still wants Gregor imprisoned, until Ripred and Mareth inform her that Gregor has recently developed romantic feelings for Queen Luxa, and would never leave Regalia while she is hospitalized. Shortly after this incident, an upset Gregor is called to the code room for an "emergency with [his] sister", and discovers eight-year-old Lizzie has come to bring him home. When the code team learns that Lizzie has an aptitude for puzzles, Ripred makes the suggestion that she replace Boots. Gregor is desperate to keep his family safe, so he extracts a promise from Ripred to protect them and keep them in the dark about Gregor's impending doom. While Lizzie works on (and ultimately solves) the code, Gregor fights the Bane's armies, struggling all the while to cope with his emotions about Luxa and Sandwich's prophecy.

Shortly before his final confrontation with the Bane, Gregor has all but lost hope for his life. Noticing this, Ripred tells him that he doesn't believe Gregor has to die, because the old rat has never believed in Sandwich's prophetic ability. This revelation inspires Gregor to ultimately defeat the unstable Bane. Two weeks later, a wounded Gregor awakens in the hospital and learns of a series of crushing events. Though the humans routed the rats, Ares died in the Firelands of wounds inflicted by the Bane; Ripred is presumed dead; and Vikus has been partially paralyzed by a stroke brought on by his wife's death.

Though Gregor no longer feels bound by it, many Underlanders wonder how the prophecy can be fulfilled while "the warrior" lives. At the rats' official meeting to discuss terms of surrender, they have their answer. Angered by both a half-dead Ripred and Luxa's readiness to return to war, Gregor breaks Bartholomew of Sandwich's sword on his knees and pronounces the warrior officially dead. Ripred and Luxa, agreeing with Gregor's sentiment, do something unprecedented and bond as a sign of their mutual desire for peace. Afterward, delegates from each species meet to negotiate more a specific treaty while Gregor's family says their goodbyes and returns to New York. The novel ends as Gregor's parents discuss a move to Virginia while their children wonder how they can ever forget the Underland. Gregor takes his sisters to the park, where he remains haunted by traumatic memories of the Underland, then notes that Boots has finally learned how to say his name.

== Characters ==
=== Major characters ===
- Gregor: The series' protagonist, the Overland "warrior" of Bartholomew of Sandwich's prophecies, and a rager (a warrior with berserker-like fighting ability). Despite his tremendous skills as a fighter, Gregor cares deeply for those around him and tries very hard to retain his humanity during the Underland war. He develops romantic feelings for the Underlander Luxa.
- Ares: A large, very strong black bat and Gregor's bond. Before the war, he was shunned by bats and humans alike for allowing his bond Henry to die. During the war, however, the public's opinion of him begins to change because of his skills as a warrior. Ares is heralded as a hero upon his death in the region known as Tartarus.
- Ripred: A rat, rager, and seasoned warrior. Ripred's immense experience and wisdom lead to his acting as general, strategist, and skilled fighter for the humans. Ripred never loses sight of his own goals, however, which almost restarts the human-gnawer conflict after the end of their war. Ripred becomes fond of Gregor's sister Lizzie, who reminds him of one of his deceased pups, and bonds with Queen Luxa in part because of his concern for her and her family.
- Luxa: The Underlanders' young queen, granddaughter of Solovet and Vikus. Luxa is proud, stubborn, and cares deeply for her friends. Though her friend Gregor admires these traits in general, they are not an asset for her during wartime, and this causes some conflict for her throughout the book. Luxa has been bonded to the flier Aurora since childhood, and bonds to the rat Ripred at the end of the novel. She also begins to develop romantic feelings for Gregor.
- Lizzie: Gregor's little sister and "princess" of the prophecy (by her relation to Boots). Lizzie is very bright, but suffers from frequent panic attacks. As such, her older brother worries for her safety and almost refuses to allow her to stay in the Underland. The rat Ripred is mainly responsible for Gregor's change of heart, and promises to protect Lizzie with his life. Lizzie believes Ripred to be lonely, and is heartbroken when she thinks Ripred has died fulfilling his promise. The successful cracking of The Code of Claw is due in large part to her efforts.
- Boots (Margaret): Gregor and Lizzie's toddler sister. She is known by the crawlers as "the princess", which leads the Underland humans to believe she is important to the code-breaking effort. Her greatest importance to the story, however, comes from the contrast she presents between herself and her older brother. Gregor struggles to keep her in the dark about the terrible things going on around her, but is not entirely successful.
- Solovet: The Regalian army's head and wife of statesman Vikus. Gregor distrusts Solovet because of her involvement with the plague, but is forced to obey her orders because of her capability as a military commander. Gregor freely admits that the training she forces on him may have kept him alive, but still hates her for imprisoning him in the Regalian dungeon. Solovet is ambushed while on a diplomatic mission towards the end of the war and dies. Her husband, knowing that he could have saved her at the cost of revealing that the humans solved the Code of Claw, experiences a stroke as a result, and almost dies himself.
- The Bane (Pearlpelt): A highly unstable, gigantic white rat believed to be a harbinger of doom in the Underland. The Bane is emotionally fragile but extremely dangerous, especially when goaded on by his "friend" Twirltongue. He personally kills numerous Underland creatures, including the flier Ares. He is killed by Gregor and Ares in the last few chapters of the novel.

== Codes in book ==
=== Tree of Transmission ===
The "Tree of Transmission" is a visual representation of the Underland equivalent of Morse code, i.e. a method of transmitting information over long distances using repeating patterns. The code has no official name, as it is the only code to have been created by humans, rats, mice, spiders, crawlers, and bats together. It is transmitted with sound, usually through the stone of tunnels. Unlike Morse code, it used three distinct sounds (a "click", a "scratch", and a "tap"), while Morse code uses only two symbols differentiated by the length of transmission.

The Tree of Transmission is so named because of one of the humans' ways of representing it. In the code room of the Regalian palace, there is a wall carving showing the letters of the alphabet as "branches" off of each of the three main sounds. For example, if one heard a scratch (by itself, the letter A) followed by a tap; one would start at A and then move to the right on the chart to reach the letter D, and so forth. If one heard a scratch and then a click, on the other hand; one would start at A and move left to reach B. When viewed from a distance, the chart looks somewhat like a tree — hence the name. The code can also be represented more like a traditional Morse code chart, and is carved like this onto the floor of the code room. This form of the chart is reproduced below.

A | B | \ C | | D | / E \ F | | \ G | | |	H | | / I / J | \ \ K | \ | L | \ / M | / \ N | / |	O | / / P \ \ Q \ | R \ / S / \ T / | U / /	V | | \ \ W | | / / X | | | \ Y | | | / Z | | | |

==== The Code of Claw ====
In this book, the gnawers have developed something called the "Code of Claw.” This code is not the same one referred to by the Tree of Transmission, though it is usually transmitted using that code. The gnawers' code is actually a cipher which uses "Gorger" (also an anagram of the word "Gregor"), with recurring letters removed to form "Gore" — easily remembered by the rat armies — to make it more difficult to crack. In this code, each letter is "shifted" one over in the alphabet, except for the letters in the secret word, which stay the same. A becomes B, B becomes C, C becomes D, and so on. G, O, R, and E remain the same. This code is of great importance because of its mention in the Prophecy of Time and its usefulness to the human war effort.

== Reception ==
Gregor and the Code of Claw has been reviewed favorably by critics, yet its print version never reached the top of bestseller lists except as part of The Underland Chronicles. The audiobook version received considerably more public attention, receiving the 2009 ALSC Notable Children's Recording Award for its "originality, creativity, and suitability for children". In particular, the recording is praised for narrator Paul Boehmer's appropriately solemn tone and effective treatment of characters. A 2009 AudioFile review states, "Boehmer creates atmosphere by slightly modulating his voice to depict the darker tone of the story and the maturity of its theme. The satisfying conclusion is bittersweet as listeners say good-bye to the many unforgettable characters in this finely crafted series."

The Underland Chronicles was a New York Times, Book Sense, and USA Today bestselling series, but its fifth novel reached only 116th place on a list of best-selling hardcover novels compiled by Publishers Weekly in the year it was published. However, the book's position on that list remained mostly unchanged for the next four years. A Booklist review for the novel reads, "well-written, fast-moving, action-packed fantasy"—a sentiment generally shared by book critics. The novel has also received critical acclaim for being an excellent conclusion to its series. A School Library Journal review praises the "realistic conclusion, including the loss of old friends and a message about the importance of peace and trust, [leaving] readers with a sense of optimism about the future of the Underland." The story's Kirkus Reviews review makes a similar observation: "The resolution is bittersweet but faintly hopeful—a fitting end for an unflinchingly gutsy series whose deftly drawn characters have always lived dangerously."

The novel's main criticisms have centered on its mature themes, which are much more prominent in the somber Gregor and the Code of Claw than in the series's other books. Comparisons between The Underland Chronicles and Suzanne Collins's later Hunger Games trilogy cite parallels between this final novel more than any other, and note the series' many violent moments. This trend culminates with the events of Gregor and the Code of Claw, and sets the scene for Collins's later works. One Kirkus reviewer comments that though this is "heavy stuff" for preteens, the novel is an excellent "read-alike" for series such as The Heroes of Olympus, which also possess more complex themes.
