= Cloister (disambiguation) =

A cloister is a covered walkway with an open colonnade on one side that faces a quadrangle or garth.

Cloister or cloisters may also refer to:

- Cloister (cocktail), a gin-based cocktail
- Cloister (typeface), a serif typeface
- Cloister Inn, one of the undergraduate eating clubs at Princeton University
- The Cloisters (disambiguation)

== See also ==
- Cloistered clergy, religious orders whose members strictly separate themselves from the affairs of the external world
- Cloyster, a Pokémon
