= Gregor and the Curse of the Warmbloods =

2005 book by Suzanne Collins

- First edition
- Author: Suzanne Collins
- Cover artist: Daniel Craig, August Hall
- Language: English
- Series: The Underland Chronicles
- Genre: Fantasy
- Publisher: Scholastic
- Publication date: July 1, 2005
- Publication place: United States
- Pages: 308
- ISBN: 0-439-65623-0
- OCLC: 56686615
- LC Class: PZ7.C6837 Gp 2005
- Preceded by: Gregor and the Prophecy of Bane
- Followed by: Gregor and the Marks of Secret

Gregor and the Curse of the Warmbloods is an epic fantasy children's novel by Suzanne Collins. It is the third book in The Underland Chronicles, and was first published by Scholastic in 2005. The novel takes place a few months after the events of the preceding book, in the same subterranean world known as the Underland. In this installment, the young protagonist Gregor is once again recruited by the Underland's inhabitants, this time to help cure a rapidly-spreading plague.

Gregor and the Curse of the Warmbloods has been published as stand-alone hardcovers and paperbacks, as well as part of a boxed set. It was released as an audiobook on December 13, 2005, read by Paul Boehmer. In August 2010, it was released in ebook form. It has been lauded for "[addressing] a number of political issues ... in a manner accessible to upper elementary and middle school readers".

== Development ==
Collins has listed two main sources of influence in her writing of The Underland Chronicles. First is her M.F.A. in dramatic writing and her experience as a screenwriter. This writing experience resulted in her structuring books "like a three-act play", and paying close attention to the plot's pacing. Gregor and the Curse of the Warmbloods came third in "a series of narratives that are interrelated yet can stand on their own", a fact not missed by reviewers. Collins' other source of inspiration was her father Michael Collins, a lieutenant colonel in the United States Air Force, who provided her with advice about the war tactics used in her books, and also instilled in her an "impulse to educate young people about the realities of war".

== Plot summary ==
Despite the difficulties it has caused for his family, Gregor finds it hard to distance himself from the Underland. When he receives word that a plague has broken out and his bond Ares is one of the victims, he heads down to help with yet another of Bartholomew of Sandwich's prophecies. His mother, however, hates the Underland and only allows Boots and Gregor below on the condition that she comes with them. The humans' plague expert, Dr. Neveeve, explains that there is a plant called starshade growing deep in the Vineyard of Eyes which can be distilled into a cure. In the midst of the meeting, a dying bat infected with the plague inadvertently infects one of the delegates–Gregor's mother.

Gregor immediately joins a group of creatures on a quest to find the starshade, as described in "The Prophecy of Blood". The current queen, Nerissa, has arranged for Hamnet–the estranged, pacifistic son of Solovet and Vikus–to be their guide. Hamnet, his Halflander son Hazard, and their hisser companion Frill lead the motley crew through the dangerous Jungle and numerous setbacks. During a near-death experience with a pool of quicksand, the group encounters Luxa, the heir apparent of Regalia who was assumed to be dead after the quest in Gregor and the Prophecy of Bane. She and her bond Aurora were trapped in the Jungle when Aurora dislocated her wing, and have been living there with a colony of nibblers (mice). After Hamnet fixes Aurora's wing, the bonds accompany the questers.

They arrive at the Vineyard of Eyes, but an army of cutters (ants, who would like to see all warm-blooded creatures gone) destroys the starshade and kill both Hamnet and Frill. The group's hopes are crushed until they realize a new possibility: that the plague was developed by the humans as a biological agent to be used against the rats. The group hastens home, and find their theory proved correct by the humans' new medication, developed without the supposed "cradle cure." Luxa furiously exposes the covert military project. Dr. Neveeve is executed for her participation and Solovet, the project's head, is imprisoned in preparation for a trial. Following up on a promise to Ripred, Luxa sends doses of the cure to the gnawers while the Regalian hospital treats as many human and bat victims as possible. Though she is healing, Gregor's mother is too weak to go home, and so the book ends with Gregor heading home with Boots. Realizing how much help his family needs, he decides to reveal their secret to Mrs. Cormaci.

=== The Prophecy of Blood ===
The "Prophecy of Blood" is unusual in two ways: it is the first of Bartholomew of Sandwich's prophecies to feature a repeating "refrain"; and it is carved backwards in a tight corner of the prophecy room, so that a mirror is required to read it. Nerissa tells Gregor she believes Sandwich purposely made it "difficult to read" in order to emphasize how difficult it is to understand, and Gregor later hypothesizes that Sandwich forced the humans to read it using mirrors so that, as a person read, "[they] would see [themselves]". Ripred similarly points out that an "annoying little dance" Boots makes up to go along with the prophecy's refrain echoes this theme, by forcing the questers to turn and see themselves before they realize that the plague originated with the humans. Boots's "help" deciphering this prophecy leads characters to rely on her to do the same in the series' later books. In Gregor and the Marks of Secret, Boots begins dancing to a song Sandwich carved "in the nursery, not the room of prophecies" after the characters witness the mass execution of a group of nibblers and becomes "totally convinced" that the song is actually yet another prophecy. In Gregor and the Code of Claw, when the "Prophecy of Time" calls for a "princess" to crack a cryptogram, Boots is immediately assigned the role because of her importance to the last two prophecies, despite the fact that she is still a toddler.

The repeating refrain goes as follows:

Turn and turn and turn again.
You see the what but not the when.
Remedy and wrong entwine,
And so they form a single vine.

Gregor hypothesizes that Sandwich included a cryptic repeating segment in the prophecy to drum the meaning of these lines into the heads of his readers, or to emphasize their importance. The prophecy's other stanzas describe the plague and who it affects, call for the warrior's return, explain how to find the cure and win allies amongst the nonhuman species, and warn strongly against allowing a war to start in the Underland. Gregor refers to this final point as "Sandwich's usual prediction that if things didn't work out, there would be total destruction and everybody would end up dead." As with other prophecies in The Underland Chronicles, its meaning "only becomes clear in the later stages of the book".

== Characters ==
=== Quest members ===
- Gregor: A young Overlander and "rager", said to be the warrior mentioned in "The Prophecy of Gray".
- Boots (Margaret): Boots is Gregor's toddler sister. She is called the "princess" by the crawlers, and has a knack for recognizing different insects.
- Hamnet: A former soldier and son of Solovet and Vikus who leads the questers through the Jungle until his death.
- Hazard: The child of Hamnet and an unnamed Overlander woman. Hazard is gifted with languages.
- Ripred: A gnawer (rat) and rager like Gregor.
- Mange and Lapblood: A male and female rat, respectively, who are trying to save their pups from the plague. Mange is eaten by a carnivorous plant, and his death deeply upsets Lapblood.
- Temp: The crawlers' representative on the quest. He is endlessly patient and brave, especially with his "princess." He also has an uncanny knack to recognize danger before other questers, though his warnings are often ignored.
- Frill: A hisser who has been living with Hamnet and Hazard. She dies fighting the cutters.
- Nike: A black and white flier (bat) who helps Gregor while Ares is incapacitated. She is the daughter of the fliers' queen, and has a permanently optimistic disposition.
- Luxa and Aurora: Two unofficial members of the quest who join the group after learning of the plague. The two were trapped in the Jungle in Gregor and the Prophecy of Bane when Aurora's wing was dislocated.

== Publication ==
The book was originally released as an individual hardcover in 2005, then as a paperback in July 2006. In 2013, a new edition of the novel was published as part of a paperback boxed set of the five books in The Underland Chronicles, featuring new cover art by Vivienne To. Other sets have been released by Scholastic as well. The first was in the US on September 1, 2009, and a second on August 1, 2013, in the UK, again with new art.

Random House Audio released an audiobook version in December 2005. It was read by actor and narrator Paul Boehmer. A School Library Journal review praised Boehmer's "distinct voice" for each character and called the edition a "good purchase for both school and public libraries". A Booklist review also lauded Boehmer for "keeping his narrative pace even, [helping] listeners keep the complex story straight". The book's first ebook version was released in August 2010.

Since its first printing in 2005, a number of alternate editions have been produced. Scholastic has signed rights to publishers working in a total of 19 different languages. As of 2016, editions have appeared in German, French, Chinese, Polish, Swedish, Norwegian, Dutch, Italian, Finnish, Bulgarian, Spanish, Portuguese, and Turkish. Multiple editions with unique cover art have been published for most of these languages. Scholastic advertised the second English edition, released exactly one year after the first, as having "fresh new cover art" by August Hall.

== Reception ==
Gregor and the Curse of the Warmbloods has been positively reviewed by professional and amateur critics alike. Many reviews focus on the book particularly as a sequel to the first two of the series. In the words of Tasha Saecker of School Library Journal, for example, "Collins maintains the momentum, charm, and vivid settings of the original title." The Horn Book Magazine's review went further, saying that "This immensely readable installment won't disappoint fans of the first two books. In fact, Collins seems to have hit her stride with this page-turner."

Kirkus mentioned the novel's more serious plot and themes with the review's comment, "This offering takes on an even darker tone than the earlier ones, delving into meaty questions of territorial expansion and its justification." A review in the Library Media Connection, on the other hand, said that "Collins's subtle messages about the horrors of war and the benefits of peace" make the book "worthy of discussion" by readers of all ages. Collins herself has said that she would "like to take topics like war and introduce them at an earlier age. If you look at 'Gregor', it has all kinds of topics. There's biological warfare, there's genocide, there's military intelligence. But it's in a fantasy." Collins has also stated that she approaches her books the same way her father approached explaining his military service to her as a child: at a level understandable to children, but not without the honest descriptions needed to show the true gravity of the situation.

A review published in The Bulletin of the Center for Children's Books makes the claim that Gregor's "evolution from a scared, unwilling combatant in the first book to a morally responsible, talented warrior ... here ... makes his character realistic and appealing", and thus that the increased violence in Gregor and the Curse of the Warmbloods is a necessary part of his character development. Reviews published in Library Media Connection and VOYA also praise the novel's more serious nature as providing better insight into the politics of the Underland.

The novel was a New York Times bestseller and a Book Sense bestseller and Top-Ten Children's pick. It was awarded an Oppenheim Toy Portfolio Gold Award in 2006.
