= The Hunger Games =

Young adult book series by Suzanne Collins

- The Hunger Games (2008); Catching Fire (2009); Mockingjay (2010); The Ballad of Songbirds and Snakes (2020); Sunrise on the Reaping (2025)
- Author: Suzanne Collins
- Illustrator: Tim O'Brien (cover art)
- Country: United States
- Language: English
- Genre: Dystopian; Science fiction; Drama; Horror; Action
- Publisher: Scholastic
- Published: 2008–2010; 2020; 2025
- Media type: Print (hardcover and paperback); Audiobook; E-book
- No. of books: 3 originals, 2 prequels
- Website: suzannecollinsbooks.com

The Hunger Games is a series of young adult dystopian novels written by American author Suzanne Collins. The series consists of a trilogy that follows teenage protagonist Katniss Everdeen, as well as two prequels. The Hunger Games universe is a dystopia set in Panem, a post-apocalyptic North American country consisting of the wealthy Capitol and 12 districts in varying states of poverty. As punishment for rebellion, the Capitol hosts an annual battle royale competition called The Hunger Games. Each of the 12 districts must send two children between the ages of 12 and 18 to participate, and the last surviving child is dubbed the victor.

The novels in the trilogy are titled The Hunger Games (2008), Catching Fire (2009), and Mockingjay (2010). Each was adapted into a film, forming The Hunger Games film series, with Mockingjay split into two feature-length motion pictures. The first two books were both New York Times best sellers, and Mockingjay topped all US bestseller lists upon its release. By the time the film adaptation of The Hunger Games was released in 2012, over 26 million copies of the trilogy were in print, including movie tie-in books. As of 2023, the series has sold over 100 million copies worldwide and continues to be a significant influence in young adult literature and popular culture.

The novels were all well received. In August 2012, the series ranked second, exceeded only by the Harry Potter series in NPR's poll of the top 100 teen novels. On August 17, 2012, Amazon announced the Hunger Games trilogy as its top seller, surpassing the record previously held by the Harry Potter series. As of 2014, the trilogy has sold more than 65 million copies in the U.S. alone, with The Hunger Games selling over 28 million copies, Catching Fire over 19 million, and Mockingjay over 18 million. The series has been sold in 56 territories and translated into 51 languages.

Following the release of the initial trilogy, Collins published two prequels. The first, titled The Ballad of Songbirds and Snakes, was released in May 2020 and takes place during the earlier days of the Hunger Games, featuring a young Coriolanus Snow as the protagonist. By 2023, the prequel had sold over 3.5 million copies in North America and was available in 39 languages across 39 territories. A film adaptation was released on November 17, 2023.

The second prequel novel, titled Sunrise on the Reaping, takes place after the previous prequel but before the trilogy. It follows a young Haymitch Abernathy through his victory of the 50th Hunger Games, also known as the 2nd Quarter Quell. It was published March 18, 2025 with a film adaptation that was released on November 20, 2026.

== Setting ==
The Hunger Games trilogy takes place centuries into the future in the dystopian, post-apocalyptic nation of Panem, located in North America. Panem consists of twelve (originally thirteen) districts ruled by the Capitol, a city in the Rocky Mountains. The Capitol embodies oppression at its peak and thrives in decadence, lavishly rich and technologically advanced, but the districts toil in deprivation, existing in varying states of poverty. Due to large-scale flooding, Panem is smaller than present-day North America, with many current coastal regions portrayed as being underwater.

The trilogy's narrator and protagonist, Katniss Everdeen, lives in District 12, the poorest region of Panem, located in Appalachia, where people regularly die of starvation. As punishment for a past rebellion against the Capitol (called the "Dark Days"), in which District 13 was supposedly destroyed, one boy and one girl from each of the twelve remaining districts, between the ages of 12 and 18, are selected by lottery to compete in an annual pageant called the Hunger Games. The Games are a televised event in which the participants, called "tributes", are forced to fight to the death in an enclosed arena. The lone victor and their home district are then rewarded with food, supplies, and riches. The purposes of the Hunger Games are to provide entertainment for the Capitol and to remind the districts of the Capitol's power and its lack of remorse or forgiveness for the failed rebellion of the current competitors' ancestors.

It has not been made clear what the state of the world outside Panem is; no other countries have been mentioned in the series, assuming any still exist.

== Structure ==
Each book in The Hunger Games trilogy has three sections of nine chapters each. Collins has said this format comes from her playwriting background, which taught her to write in a three-act structure; her previous series, The Underland Chronicles, was written in the same way. She sees each group of nine chapters as a separate part of the story, and comments still call those divisions "act breaks".

== Origins ==
Collins says she drew inspiration for the series from both classical and contemporary sources. Her main classical source of inspiration is the Greek myth of Theseus and the Minotaur, in which, as a punishment for past crimes, Minos forces Athens to sacrifice seven youths and seven maidens to the Minotaur, which kills them in a vast labyrinth. Collins says that even as a child, she was stunned by the idea since "it was just so cruel" to force Athens to sacrifice its own children.

Collins also cites as a classical inspiration the Roman gladiator games. She feels three key elements create a good game: an all powerful and ruthless government, people forced to fight to the death, and the game's role as a source of popular entertainment.

A contemporary source of inspiration was Collins' recent fascination with reality television programs. She says they are like The Hunger Games because the Games are not just entertainment but also a reminder to the districts of their rebellion. Collins says that while she was channel-surfing the television on a quiet night, she saw people competing for a prize and then saw footage of the Iraq War. She described how the two combined in an "unsettling way" to create her first ideas for the series.

== Novels ==
=== Trilogy ===
The Hunger Games box set image

==== The Hunger Games ====
The Hunger Games is the first book in the series and was released on September 14, 2008.

The Hunger Games follows 16-year-old Katniss Everdeen, a girl from District 12 who volunteers for the 74th Hunger Games in place of her younger sister Primrose Everdeen. Also selected from District 12 is Peeta Mellark, who once saved Katniss from starvation when they were children. They are mentored by their district's only living victor, Haymitch Abernathy, who won 24 years earlier and has since led a solitary life of alcoholism.

Peeta confesses his longtime secret love for Katniss in a televised interview prior to the Games. This revelation stuns Katniss, who usually does not allow herself to think of romantic attraction due to her traumatic childhood and her fear of losing future children to the Hunger Games. However, she believes that Peeta is only feigning love for her as a tactic for the Games.

In the arena, Peeta saves Katniss's life multiple times without her realizing. Katniss allies with Rue, a young tribute from District 11 who reminds Katniss of her sister. When Rue is killed, Katniss places flowers around her body as an act of defiance toward the Capitol. The remaining tributes are alerted to a rule change allowing tributes from the same district to win as a team. Katniss finds a seriously wounded Peeta, and, rather than competing alone and being unencumbered by him, risks her life to nurse him back to health. Haymitch advises her to feign feelings for Peeta in order to gain wealthy sponsors who can provide crucial supplies to the "star-crossed lovers" during the Games. As she allows herself to get close to Peeta, she develops real feelings for him.

Once each of the other tributes has died, the rule change allowing two winners from the same district is abruptly revoked. With neither willing to kill the other, Katniss and Peeta decide to commit mutual suicide by eating nightlock, a poisonous berry. Without the prospect of a singular winner, the authorities frantically concede, announcing that both Katniss and Peeta have won the Games, just in time to save their lives. During and after the Games, Katniss's genuine feelings for Peeta grow, and she struggles to reconcile them with the fact that their relationship developed under duress.

Haymitch warns her that the danger is far from over. The Capitol is furious toward them due to their act of defiance, and the only way to try to allay its anger is to continue to pretend that her actions were solely because she was madly in love with Peeta. On the journey home, Peeta is dismayed to learn of the deception.

==== Catching Fire ====
Catching Fire is the second installment in the series, released on September 1, 2009.

In Catching Fire, which begins six months after the conclusion of The Hunger Games, Katniss learns that her defiance in the previous novel has started a chain reaction that has inspired rebellion in the districts. President Snow threatens to harm Katniss's family and friends if she does not help to defuse the unrest and marry Peeta. Meanwhile, Peeta has become aware of Katniss's disingenuous love for him, but while he feels sad, he does not pressure her in any way. He has also been informed of Snow's threats, so he promises to help keep up the act to spare the citizens of District 12. Katniss's best friend, Gale Hawthorne, confesses his love for Katniss, which shocks and confuses her.

Katniss and Peeta tour the districts as victors and plan a public wedding. While they follow Snow's orders and keep up the ruse, Katniss and Peeta inadvertently fuel the rebellion, and the pin of a mockingjay (a fictional hybrid bird) that she wears becomes its symbol. District by district, the citizens of Panem begin to stage uprisings against the Capitol. Snow announces a special 75th edition of the Hunger Games—known as the Quarter Quell—in which Katniss and Peeta are forced to compete with other past victors, effectively canceling the wedding.

Katniss believes that Peeta should survive these Games instead of her, and dedicates her life to saving him. Peeta, in turn, dedicates his life to saving her, and they both acknowledge the other's opposite intentions. At Haymitch's urging, the pair teams up with several other tributes and manages to destroy the arena and escape the Games. Katniss is rescued by rebel forces from District 13, and learns that the Capitol has captured both Peeta and their District 7 ally, Johanna Mason. Katniss ultimately learns—to her surprise—that she had inadvertently been an integral part of the rebellion all along; her rescue had been jointly planned by Haymitch, Head game maker Plutarch Heavensbee, and District 4 victor Finnick Odair, among others. At the knowledge that Peeta has been captured and will now be tortured and killed, Katniss is furious and loses the will to live.

Gale informs her that the Capitol has destroyed District 12 in retaliation, and after some hesitation, Katniss joins the rebels on behalf of the Mockingjay opposition.

==== Mockingjay ====
Mockingjay, the third and final book in The Hunger Games series, was released on August 24, 2010.

Most of the districts have rebelled against the Capitol, led by District 13 and its president Alma Coin. It is revealed that the Capitol lied about the district being destroyed in the Dark Days. After a standoff with the Capitol, the District 13 residents took to living underground and rebuilding their strength. The District 12 survivors find shelter with them. Katniss also learns that Peeta is alive and is being tortured and forced to speak on national television discouraging the rebellion. She agrees to become the "Mockingjay", the symbol of the rebellion. In return, she demands immunity for Peeta, Johanna Mason, Annie Cresta, and Enobaria, fellow Games victors captured by the Capitol. Katniss also demands the privilege of killing President Snow herself.

When Katniss realizes that the Capitol will keep torturing Peeta as long as she fuels the rebellion, she has a panic attack and loses the ability to function as the Mockingjay. A rescue mission is mounted that succeeds in rescuing Peeta, Johanna and Annie. However, Peeta has been brainwashed to kill Katniss, and he tries to strangle her to death upon their reunion. He undergoes experimental treatment to try to cure him. Katniss does not have hope for his recovery, and decides to give her all to the rebellion and die in the process.

Throughout the novel, Katniss sees how ruthless Gale is. He does not seem to value human life as much as she does. He feels no sympathy for the enemies to the rebellion, and he feels fine with torture and murder, even of innocent civilians, to advance the rebellion. She struggles to reconcile this with the fact that she still cares for Gale. Amid her crushing loneliness and her PTSD, she kisses Gale, but he says that the kiss is not real as it is like "kissing someone who's drunk."

After she recovers from Peeta's attack, Katniss and a team known as the "Star Squad", composed of Gale, Peeta, Finnick, a camera crew, and various other soldiers, are assigned to film propaganda in relatively quiet combat zones. Katniss, however, decides to go to the Capitol to kill Snow, pretending Coin gave her that mission. Peeta still struggles with his brainwashing, but he is in recovery and is still in love with Katniss. Most of the squad are killed along the way, including recently married Finnick. As Katniss approaches Snow's mansion, she sees a group of Capitol children surrounding it as human shields. Suddenly a hovercraft drops silver parachutes on the children, who reach for them, hoping they bear food. Some of the parachutes explode, creating carnage. The advancing rebels send in medics, including Primrose Everdeen. Then the rest of the parachutes explode, killing Primrose just as she sees her sister.

Later, Katniss, also injured, awakens from a coma to learn that the rebels have won, and Snow is awaiting execution at her hands. When she meets Snow by chance, he claims that it was Coin who secretly ordered the bombings in order to strip away the support of his remaining followers. This bomb also matches the description of the one Gale was helping to devise, and she breaks off her friendship with Gale. Coin then asks the surviving victors to vote on a final Hunger Games, involving the children of high-ranking Capitol officials (including Snow's granddaughter). In order to gain Coin's trust, Katniss and Haymitch cast the deciding votes in favor of the scheme. However, at what is supposed to be Snow's execution, Katniss instead kills Coin with her bow. Snow laughs, then dies from either choking or at the hands of the crowd watching the execution. Katniss attempts to commit suicide, but Peeta stops her and she is instead arrested.

Katniss is tried, but the jury believes she was mentally unfit, and she is sent home to District 12. Both Katniss's mother and Gale take jobs in other districts. Peeta regains his sanity. Katniss settles down with him, and the two "grow back together." After many years, she finally agrees to have children. They have a girl and then a boy, who grow up in a world without the Hunger Games. To cope with her lingering PTSD, Katniss often spends time recounting every kind deed she has ever witnessed anyone do.

=== Prequels ===
==== The Ballad of Songbirds and Snakes ====
A prequel to the trilogy, titled The Ballad of Songbirds and Snakes, was released on May 19, 2020. The novel is set 64 years before The Hunger Games events, ten years after the end of the failed uprising against the Capitol. The story follows an 18-year-old Coriolanus Snow, whose family name has fallen from grace as the remaining Snows live in poverty and struggle to keep up appearances in post-war Panem. Snow becomes a mentor for the 10th annual Hunger Games as his final project before graduating from school. Snow shows great commitment in mentoring his tribute Lucy Gray Baird from the impoverished District 12 because her winning means he will be awarded a monetary prize that will cover his university tuition. Though skeptical at first, Snow believes he can turn the odds of the Games in his favor after seeing Lucy Gray defiantly sing during her reaping ceremony. During his time spent mentoring Lucy Gray, Snow begins to fall in love with her and must choose between her and his promising political future. Collins credits her character Lucy Gray as having introduced the concept of entertainment into the Hunger Games with her performative and musical talent.

==== Sunrise on the Reaping ====
A new prequel, titled Sunrise on the Reaping, was announced on June 6, 2024. The novel is set 24 years before The Hunger Games events, during the 50th Hunger Games won by Haymitch Abernathy, and was released on March 18, 2025. A film adaptation was announced by Lionsgate also on June 6, 2024, and released in theatres on November 20, 2026.

== Themes ==
Major themes of the novels include distrust of authority (of adults and the government), class discrimination and caste, resistance, the ethics of entertainment, and most notably, the origins and effects of war. Social inequality, unaccountable governance and violence against children have also been suggested as prominent themes. "In the world of the 'Hunger Games', the Capitol lives a life of extravagant wealth and consumption. Meanwhile, out in the 'districts', millions of people work dangerous jobs with low pay. As the Capitol wallows in excess, the districts can barely afford to feed their children." Author Suzanne Collins also mentions the themes of "just war", gladiatorial combat and hunger. War as a result of climate disaster, and the power and illusions of television have also been cited as themes. Others have mentioned revolution and rebellion as themes. "Although it's... aimed at young adults, it presents potentially quite subversive ideas of mass revolution, economic sabotage and the populist fight against oligarchy."

== Critical reception ==
All five books have been favorably received. Praise has focused on the addictive quality, especially of the first book, and the action. Young adult fiction author John Green, writing for The New York Times, compared The Hunger Games with Scott Westerfeld's The Uglies series. Catching Fire was praised for improving upon the first book, and Mockingjay was praised for its portrayal of violence, well-realized worldbuilding, and romantic intrigue.

The series received criticism regarding its reality TV "death game" theme being derivative of earlier works, particularly Battle Royale, as well as The Running Man, The Long Walk, The 10th Victim, and Series 7: The Contenders. The series was also criticized for the romantic plotline: Rollie Welch of Ohio's The Plain Dealer criticized the characters' lack of resolute behavior, and Jennifer Reese of Entertainment Weekly stated that there was little distinction between Peeta and Gale and the series lacked the "erotic energy" seen in the Twilight series.

J.C. Maçek III of PopMatters stated, "While the film saga does capture the action of The Hunger Games, the novels are most assuredly the heart of the story. They are nothing less than 'The Writer's Cut' of the films themselves." In his review Mike Ruiz argues that The Hunger Games film does not have the first-person narrative that is in the original novel. As a result, Ruiz contends the novel is better than the film.

The last book, Mockingjay, was criticized by Dan Shade of SF Site, who felt that Katniss is a weaker character than her comrades and less resolute in her journey to the Capitol, and that with respect to her vendetta against President Snow, her actions in the finale are inconsistent with her established character.

On November 5, 2019, the BBC News listed The Hunger Games on its list of the 100 most influential novels.

== Adaptations ==
=== Film adaptations ===
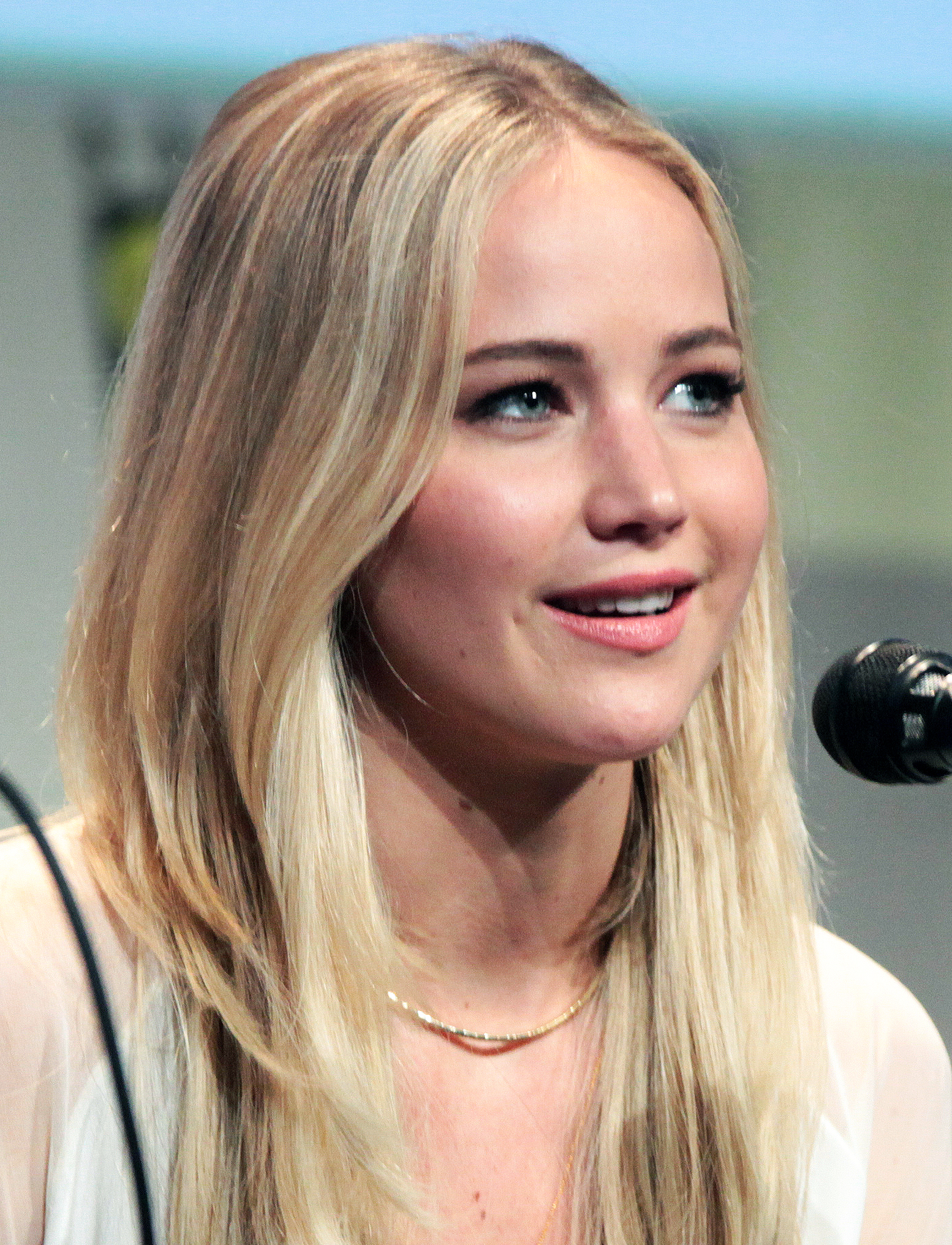
Jennifer Lawrence played Katniss in the film adaptations.

Lionsgate Entertainment acquired worldwide distribution rights to a film adaptation of The Hunger Games, produced by Nina Jacobson's Color Force production company. Collins adapted the novel for film herself, along with director Gary Ross. The cast included Jennifer Lawrence as Katniss, Josh Hutcherson as Peeta, and Liam Hemsworth as Gale. The first film began production in Spring 2011, and was released in March 2012. For Catching Fire, Ross was replaced as director by Francis Lawrence; the film was released in November 2013. Lawrence then directed Mockingjay, Part 1 and Part 2, released in November 2014 and November 2015 respectively.

The prequel was adapted for film, with Francis Lawrence as the director. The film was produced by Lawrence himself alongside Nina Jacobson, and Brad Simpson with Suzanne Collins as one of the executive producers. The cast includes Tom Blyth as Coriolanus Snow, Rachel Zegler as Lucy Gray Baird, and Hunter Schafer as Tigris Snow. It was released on November 17, 2023.

A film adaptation of Sunrise on the Reaping released on November 20, 2026.

=== Stage play ===
A West End stage production based on The Hunger Games was originally set to premiere in autumn 2024, but was moved to January 2025. The play, written by Conor McPherson and directed by Matthew Dunster, began previews on October 20, 2025, with opening night on November 12, 2025, at the Troubadour Canary Wharf Theatre in London. The play was adapted from the first book in the series.

== Cultural impact ==
The Hunger Games, along with 2012 film Brave, have been credited with increasing female interest in archery. Immediately following the release of the first Hunger Games film, many archery vendors experienced a significant upsurge in business, with their lessons fully booked and recurve bows on long periods of back-order. In a 2016 report, approximately half of the girl archers surveyed were influenced by The Hunger Games to take up the sport.

Online users have likened some aspects of the Gaza war and genocide to The Hunger Games, including the humanitarian crisis in Gaza and the 2024 Met Gala which took place near protests in New York City. An organization called the "Gaza Humanitarian Foundation" was accused of staging hunger games in Gaza, in which Israeli soldiers would kill hundreds of Palestinians as the latter desperately tried to reach food. Jan Egeland, Philippe Lazzarini, and others have referred to the Rafah aid distribution killings as "hunger games".

The three-finger gesture used in the books to express unity with the rebellion has been used in real-life protests in Thailand (2014, 2020) and Myanmar (2021). American University in Washington D.C. offered a class 2014-2016 that examined the themes in The Hunger Games world titled "The Hunger Games: Class, Politics, and Marketing". The class was offered for the school's American Studies Program and covered topics of oppression, feminism, food deserts, rebellion, the publishing industry, and social media marketing. The course's professor, Stef Woods, believes that using the fictional world of Panem to discuss real-world problems helps students better understand sociopolitical issues in American society.

In November 2025, Grace Reiter directed and starred in a parody short-film titled The Hunger Games (but Better), amassing millions of views on YouTube.

== See also ==
- The Most Dangerous Game, a 1924 short story about a big game hunter who is hunted down by another hunter on an isolated island
- The Long Walk, a 1979 dystopian novel about a deadly walking contest
- Battle Royale, a 1999 dystopian novel with a similar premise of people forced into death fights with each other
