= List of The Underland Chronicles characters =

This is a list of The Underland Chronicles characters, organized according to the species names used in the series. These names usually refer to a common trait or habit of the species.

== Humans ==
=== Overlanders ===
The term Overlander refers to any human born in the Overland to parents who were also born there. In general, they have darker skin and hair than Underlanders, and their eyes range from blue to brown. These differences are not permanent, however, as all Underlanders are descendants of Overlanders who lost these qualities over time.

- Gregor - Gregor is an eleven-year-old New Yorker who discovers the Underland when his little sister Margaret, nicknamed Boots, falls into their apartments ventilation system. He is believed to be the "warrior" described in Bartholomew of Sandwich's prophecies. He is also a rager, or someone who is overcome by a kind of powerful frenzy in battle that is hard to control (similar to the berserkers of Norse mythology). Gregor tries to avoid fighting when he can, at first because he believes that a peaceful resolution to a problem is the best kind of solution, and later because he is scared of how good he is at fighting due to his rager "powers". In Gregor and the Code of Claw, he learns echolocation, a valuable skill for fighting in the dark. In Gregor the Overlander, he bonds with the flier Ares. He develops romantic feelings for Luxa, but their relationship does not progress much further than a first kiss in Gregor and the Code of Claw.
- Boots (Margaret) - Gregor's youngest sister, named "Margaret" after her paternal great-grandmother; the name "Boots" originated because of how she liked to steal the family's shoes during the winter. Boots is an affectionate and friendly two-year-old. She has a special relationship with the crawlers, who revere her and call her "Princess". She also seems to have an affinity for languages, an uncanny ability to solve puzzles and notice slight differences, and is nearly fluent in Crawler by the end of the series. Despite many terrifying experiences, she remains a happy and good-natured toddler throughout the series. She is not able to pronounce Gregor's name correctly until the final pages of Gregor and the Code of Claw, having previously called him "Ge-go" or "Gre-go".
- Bartholomew of Sandwich - (mentioned) An Overlander with supposed prophetic ability who first led a group of other Overlanders into the Underland because he believed all surface life would someday end. He is the author of all the prophecies the Underlanders adhere to. Sandwich also led the original campaign to claim the land of Regalia, which he won by poisoning the water supply of the previous owners. This gave him and all of his human companions the reputation of being heartless, greedy killers. (Deceased, pre-series)
- Grace - Gregor's mother, known as "Maker of the Princess and Most Fearsome Swatter" to the crawlers. She is extremely protective of her children, which ironically leads to her being forced to allow her family to return to the Underland frequently, as she catches the plague in Gregor and the Curse of the Warmbloods and must stay below for treatment. Her greatest desire is to move her family to Virginia to get them away from the Underland.
- Gregor's dad - A high school science teacher married to Grace and the father of Boots, Lizzie, and Gregor. Exactly two years, seven months, and thirteen days before the start of Gregor the Overlander, he fell into the Underland, and was shortly captured by gnawers, who allowed him to live in return for him making weapons for them. He made them "nothing that worked twice" and was mentally and physically abused as a result. He struggles to overcome what is likely PTSD and also a strange Underland illness throughout the series. His name is never disclosed.
- Gregor's grandmother - Senile (sometimes calling Gregor "Simon") but wise, she is very interested in fate and prophecies, and supports Gregor's actions to follow them. In Book 5, she is hospitalized with a heart problem, which delays Gregor's family from leaving for Virginia. Her name is never disclosed.
- Lizzie (Elizabeth) - Gregor's middle sister (eight years old in the final novel), who goes by the nickname "Lizzie". She is very smart and good at puzzles, leading to her breaking the "Code of Claw" in Book 5. She suffers from panic attacks. She befriends Ripred, whom she reminds of Silksharp, his deceased pup. She enjoys giving him food he likes, and he is a kind of father figure toward her.
  - Jedidiah - Lizzie's only friend. Jedidiah is serious and formal, interested in puzzles, electronics, and building things. He calls Lizzie by her given name, Elizabeth.
- Mrs. Cormaci - Gregor's neighbor in his Overland apartment building. She learns of Gregor's adventures at the end of the Gregor and the Curse of the Warmbloods, and becomes a "guardian angel" to Gregor's battered family. She is very understanding of Gregor and seems to know exactly what he and his family need.
  - Mr. Cormaci - (mentioned) Husband of Mrs. Cormaci, a veteran who Gregor remembers as a kind old man. He died approximately five years before the first book. (Deceased, pre-series)
- Larry and Angelina - Gregor's friends at school. Larry is asthmatic and likes to draw. Angelina is an actress.
- Hazard's Mother - (mentioned) Met and married Hamnet after he fled to the Jungle. She had one child, Hazard, before being killed by "bugs whose bite brought quick death." (Deceased, pre-series)
- Fred Clark - (mentioned) An Overlander who fell sometime before Gregor and his sister - died in the Underland. (Deceased, pre-series)
- Coco - (mentioned) The last Overlander to fall before Gregor - died in the Underland. (Deceased, pre-series)
- Mickey - (mentioned) An Overlander who fell sometime before Gregor and Boots - died in the Underland. (Deceased, pre-series)
- Mr. Otts - A man who buys the antiques that Gregor takes from the museum in the Underland.
- Rodney - Gregor's cousin.
- Lucy - Gregor's grandma's cousin.

=== Underlanders ===
Underlanders are humans descended from a group of 800+ Overlanders brought underground by Bartholomew of Sandwich. They have nearly-translucent skin, which makes their veins much more visible, as well as very pale (and often silvery-colored) hair. Similar to albino humans, their eyes range from red to purple.

- Queen Luxa - Luxa is the crown princess of Regalia, as her late parents (killed by King Gorger before the start of the first book) were the king and queen of the city. She is the same age as Gregor and will assume full royal powers when she becomes sixteen-years-old. Luxa is a smart, rebellious, and an excellent fighter. She is also a wise leader, though sometimes sharp-tongued towards others. When Gregor first encounters her, he thinks she is arrogant and haughty, but her personality changes significantly after the death of her cousin and close friend Henry. Sometime between the end of Book 2 and the start of Book 3, she becomes trapped in the Jungle because her bond Aurora dislocates her wing and can not be moved. Afterwards she becomes very close to the nibblers who took care of her and her bat while they were there, going as far as declaring war on the gnawers when they attempt to eradicate the mice colonies. In the final book, she brings peace between the gnawers and the humans by bonding with Ripred and swearing to protect the rats. Over time, she develops romantic feelings for Gregor the Overlander, though the two part ways in Gregor and the Code of Claw. Her name is possibly derived from the word 'Lux', which means light in Latin.
- Vikus - Luxa's maternal grandfather, a Regalian diplomat, and head of the council which rules Regalia until Luxa reaches maturity. Vikus is a compassionate and wise person and always believes in the best of others. He is convinced that a peaceful resolution may be found in nearly every conflict, which brings him into conflict with many around him, including his wife Solovet, and granddaughter Luxa. In Gregor and the Code of Claw, he experiences a stroke that leaves the right side of his body mostly paralyzed.
- Prince Henry - Luxa's royal cousin (the son of her father's brother) and the first bond of the flier Ares. Aged 16, he attempted to covertly ally the humans with the rats to conquer the whole of the Underland and dies with King Gorger and the gnawer attack force when Gregor lures them off a cliff. Henry also tries to kill Ripred, an ally of the humans. He is a sharp-tongued, quick-witted troublemaker and disdainful of what he considers the "weaker" species, such as cockroaches. In later books, Luxa, Aurora, and Ares still miss him, though with some bitterness. (Deceased, Book 1)
- Howard - Luxa's eldest cousin on her mother's side and bond to the flier Pandora. He is trained in first aid and works in the Regalian hospital during the outbreak of the plague; other doctors believe he has a gift for healing. He is one of the first plague victims in the third book. After the death of his bond Pandora, he is without a flier companion, but becomes close to a bat named Nike. Though at first, she does not like him, he eventually becomes a kind of older brother figure to Princess Luxa.
  - Susannah - Howard's mother and daughter of Vikus and Solovet. She works in the Regalian hospital for some time while her son is there with the plague. She is kind and motherly toward Gregor, and appreciates his friendship with her son. She is named after Shakespeare's daughter Susanna, who had twin siblings, Judith and Hamnet, appearing in the series as well.
  - York - Howard's father, husband of Susannah, and governor of the Fount. He is a very large man and a loud fighter; he battles alongside Gregor during the fifth book.
  - Stellovet - Howard's younger sister. She is heavily disliked by Luxa because she dreams of the royal family dying so she can become the queen of Regalia. Not of royal descent.
  - Hero - Howard's second-youngest sister (twin of Kent). Not of royal descent.
  - Kent - Howard's younger brother (twin of Hero). Not of royal descent.
  - Chim ("Chimney") - Howard's youngest sister. Around five years old. Her full name is unknown, though it is believed to sound something like the word "chimney". Not of royal descent.
- Solovet - Luxa's maternal grandmother and the Regalian army's leader, except for immediately after being put on trial for treason for ordering the creation of a biological weapon. When he first meets her, Gregor the Overlander believes her to be kind and soft-spoken, but he later learns that she is, in reality, ruthless, cunning, and manipulative. She is never hesitant to use any influence she might have over a person in order to control him/her, a character trait which estranges her from several people, including her husband Vikus and son Hamnet. She is killed with the Underlanders Horatio and Marcus during a gnawer ambush while on a mission to recruit the spinners to the Regalian war effort. (Deceased, Book 5)
- Hamnet - Luxa's uncle and twin of Judith, Luxa's mother. He left Regalia for the Jungle after leading an attack to reclaim the Garden of Hesperides from the gnawers because of the terrible destruction he witnessed there and the cruelty he recognized in his mother Solovet. Though an excellent swordsman, Hamnet likes to find other ways to solve problems; living in the Jungle for ten years has taught him that not all creatures have to fight. Sometime before the first book, he met and married an Overlander, and the two had a Halflander child Hazard. He is named after Shakespeare's son, who died at a young age. He had a twin Judith, and a sister Susanna, who appears in the series as well. (Deceased, Book 3)
  - Judith - Luxa's mother and daughter of Vikus and Solovet. She is Hamnet's twin, and died at the hands of King Gorger. She is named after Shakespeare's daughter Judith, who had a twin brother Hamnet and a sister Susanna, appearing in the series too.(Deceased, pre-series)
- Princess Nerissa - Luxa's cousin (Henry's younger sister). She is the next heir to the throne of Regalia after Luxa, and takes over for her during the latter's absence in Gregor and the Curse of the Warmbloods. Nerissa is described as very frail, bordering on emaciated after the death of her brother. She sometimes has visions of the past or future and is arguably the best interpreter of Bartholomew of Sandwich's prophecies. Despite this fact, her sanity is frequently questioned by those around her, and occasionally by herself. Though very intelligent and a fair ruler, she does not wish to be queen and struggles to cope with her visions on a day-to-day basis.
- Mareth - Regalian soldier and military trainer. One of Gregor's better friends. Though his leg is amputated sometime after Gregor and the Prophecy of Bane, he remains an instructor and a sort of general, and also keeps his good humor.
- Neveeve - A Regalian doctor who developed a plague known as the "Curse of the Warmbloods" (as it does not affect cold-blooded creatures) under the orders of Solovet. She is sentenced to death for her participation, though she also developed a cure for the disease. (Deceased, Book 3)
- Dulcet - A kind and clever Regalian nanny who cares for young children in the humans' palace, aged around fifteen.
- Horatio and Marcus - Gregor's two temporary guards during the final book. Horatio has a soft spot for Dulcet. They die with Solovet. (Deceased, Book 5)
- Miravet - Sister of Solovet who works in the Regalia castle's armory. She is kinder and more affectionate than her sister.
- Perdita - A Regalian soldier. She is one of Gregor's guards in the first novel, and is injured during his fight with the gnawers Fangor and Shed. She trains Gregor in Gregor and the Code of Claw. Perdita is made acting head of the Regalian army after Solovet is killed.
- Miranda - Regalian castle servant
- Lucent - Regalian castle servant
- Claudius - Regalian guard.
- Anchel - (deceased) (mentioned)
- Daphne - (deceased) (mentioned)
- Keeda - An Underlander that mentions Anchel and Daphne, both dead, killed by rats. Keeda dies of exhaustion. (deceased) (mentioned)

=== Halflanders ===
Halflanders are humans with one Overlander parent and one Underlander parent. As the two groups rarely mix, only a few Halflanders have ever been born.

- Hazard - The six-year-old son of Hamnet and an unnamed Overlander woman; Queen Luxa of Regalia's first cousin. Unlike pure-blooded Underlanders, he has green eyes and black hair, but retains their pale skin. He lives with his father and a hisser named Frill in the Jungle until their deaths, after which he becomes a sort of younger brother to Luxa. Hazard is gifted with languages. He is fluent in human, hisser, nibbler, and cockroach; and uses his knowledge of these tongues to decipher others, including gnawer, bat, and stinger. After the death of Hamnet, Hazard becomes very attached to a young bat named Thalia, and the two plan to become bonds until her untimely death in the fourth novel.

== Fliers ==
Bats are known as fliers in the Underland. All known bat names are taken from Greek mythology. As a species, they are longtime allies of the humans, and individual fliers often choose to personally ally themselves with humans through a ceremony called bonding. Fliers can use echolocation, which gives them a nearly infallible sense of direction. Like Overworld bats, they possess large ears which help them navigate and communicate, but their eyes are much more developed than those of their smaller cousins.

- Ares: A large, strong, black bat and the bond of Henry, one of Luxa's royal cousins. Henry betrayed the questing party in Gregor the Overlander. When faced with the choice between Gregor's life and Henry's, Ares chooses to save Gregor from dying, rather than Henry, because of the latter's betrayal. In Regalia, he is put on trial for forsaking his bond. Gregor bonds with Ares to save him, but the rest of the Underland community continues to distrust the bat. In The Curse of the Warmbloods, he is a victim of an artificial plague but begins to heal after receiving the cure. He admits to Gregor that he sometimes doubts the truth of Sandwich's prophecies, on the grounds that they are "full of doom and only terrorize the Underlanders into killing each other". He is killed by the Bane in The Code of Claw while defending Gregor. He was one of the strongest bats in the Underland, possibly lending to his name, referencing the Greek god of war. (deceased in book 5)
- Aurora: Aurora is a golden bat that was bonded to Luxa at a very young age. She appears in all five books and four quests, but Gregor still does not know her well because she does not often speak to him. Because the story is told from Gregor's point of view, the readers likewise see little of Aurora.
- Ajax: In life bonded to Solovet. According to Ares, he is disliked by many, although the younger bat reserves judgment. He was huge and the color of dried blood. Dies with Solovet. (Deceased, Book 5)
- Andromeda: Bonded to Mareth. Appears in Gregor the Overlander and The Prophecy of Bane, and The Curse of the Warmbloods. She was part of the questing party in book two and caught the plague in book three. Gold and black in color.
- Euripedes: Bonded to Vikus. Gray in color.
- Nike: Nike is a princess of the fliers. She is striped in black and white and has a lively sense of humor. Nike has gone to fulfill the quests of the Prophecies of Blood and Secrets. She is not bonded but she is very close to Howard and accompanies him in the fourth book. In Book 5, she is an important player in the diplomacy talks following the war.
  - Queen Athena: Queen of the fliers, mother of Nike. Silver in color.
- Pandora: In life bonded to Howard. She had rusty-red fur and was curious, as was her Greek mythology counterpart. Died when she was devoured by flesh-eating mites on an island in the Waterway. (Deceased, Book 2)
- Thalia: A juvenile bat with peach-colored fur and a powerful love of jokes. She dies from toxic gas inhalation in the Firelands. Thalia is most likely named after the Greek muse of comedy. (Deceased, Book 4)
- Daedalus: An older bat with creamy white fur. Was on the code team.
- Hermes: Orange-and-black-speckled messenger bat. Brought Lizzie to the Underland.
- Icarus: deceased; Plague victim; accidentally spread the plague to several people, including Gregor's mother, when he flew into the arena when extremely sick. He crashes into the arena in Book 3, and dies, from too many broken bones. Both the bat and the mythical character met their demise from a fall. (Deceased, Book 3)
- Cassiopeia and Pollux: Plague victims.

== Gnawers ==
Rats are known as gnawers because of their tendency to gnaw on hard objects to wear down their constantly-growing teeth. Their names seem to relate to how the rats operate in war or to their physical characteristics. Although it is implied that all Underland species can communicate with their relatives in the Overland, the rats are one of only two races to do so often. The rats' traditional territory in the Underland includes the Dead Land and Firelands, both low on food and safety. This, along with their naturally predatory nature, has led them to factionalize and engage in many conflicts with other species.

=== Allied with Ripred ===
- Ripred - Is mentioned as an ally of the humans in all five books, though it is hinted that this was not always so. Ripred was scarred on the chest by Henry in Gregor the Overlander. He is a rager like Gregor, though far more experienced. Ripred becomes very close to Lizzie; bonded with Luxa in Code of Claw to bring peace between the humans and the rats. His favorite food is shrimp in cream sauce. Was given diagonal scar by Solovet. (Self)Proclaimed "peacemaker." Ripred reveals his scorn of the "prophecies" in Book 5. He became the new leader of the rats at the end of Code of Claw. The third known leader of the rats.
  - Silksharp - A pup of Ripred. She died in the Garden of Hesperides. Was similar in personality to Lizzie.
- Lapblood - One of two representatives for the rats in the quest for the plague cure in Book 3. Lapblood is a skilled fighter, and also the mate of Mange and mother of at least four pups. She loses the will to live after Mange's death until Gregor helps her find purpose in taking care of her two children who have not yet caught the plague. In the fifth book, Lapblood brings an army of rats to fight with Ripred against the Bane, and is later instrumental in the peace talks after the war.
  - Mange : Lapblood's mate. Died trying to get food, killed by a plant similar to a huge venus flytrap in the Jungle. (Deceased, Book 3)
  - Sixclaw and Flyfur - pups of Lapblood and Mange, who appear as a "teenagers" in Book 5.
- Twitchtip : A scent-seer: one who is able to detect any detail (including color) with smell. Twitchtip went on the quest to find the Bane as part of an agreement with Ripred to be allowed into his band of rats. She and Gregor become close during the trip when he refuses to leave her to drown in a whirlpool, and she later helps him, Ares, Luxa, Boots, and Temp escape the Labyrinth. In the fifth book, Gregor receives word that she has died after being tortured in the same pit where they kept his father. (Deceased, Book 5)

=== Allegiance unknown ===
- Cleaver - Ripred uses his corpse as cover when fleeing from flesh-eating mites. (Deceased, Book 5)
- Goldshard - The Bane's mother, died fighting her mate Snare, because she "would rather let the Bane die than trust him". All she says to Gregor is "Don't...", then she dies. Gregor realizes that he was trying to say "Don't kill my baby!". She is the only known rat with a golden coat. (Deceased, Book 2)
- Makemince - Neighbor of Lapblood; takes care of pups in Lapblood's absence.
- Ratriff - (mentioned, status unknown) Rat wounded by Bane as a "teenager".
- Razor - Ripred admonishes him for being in the company of King Gorger in the first book. Later he is the Bane's main guardian and loves the white rat like his own son. Killed by the Bane over a crawler carcass. (Deceased, Book 4)

=== Allied with King Gorger/the Bane ===
- The Bane/Pearlpelt - Prophesied destroyer; also known as Pearlpelt, the name given to him by his mother. Child of Goldshard and Snare. Pearlpelt is egocentric and self-pitying, and eventually demented. Gregor chooses to spare the baby rat's life in the second book and leaves him to be raised by Ripred, but the enormous white rat still grows up to be the monster the Regalians believe him to be. Pearlpelt's tail is his own kind of safety blanket; when Gregor partially severs it in the fifth book, the Bane loses all sense of balance (both physically and mentally). He is stabbed through the heart by Gregor, but in the process the Bane is able to kill Ares. The terrible irony is that, had Gregor allowed the baby Pearlpelt to be killed, these events would have been averted. (Deceased, Book 5)
- King Gorger - Head of the rat army and most rats in book one. Fell to his death. (Deceased, Book 1)
- Twirltongue - An extremely persuasive rat with a silvery coat. Adviser to the Bane; however, Gregor easily persuaded the Bane to see her as an opportunistic usurper; in a moment of rage, the Bane killed her, although the Bane convinces himself that Gregor actually killed her. (Deceased, Book 5)
  - Gushgore and Reekwell - Twirltongue's friends. Gushgore smashes Gregor's flashlight in book four.
- Fangor and Shed - Killed by humans on the beach after an attempt to kill Gregor. Shed, dying after Fangor, says "We will hunt you to the last rat". He said this to Gregor, and it means all the rats allied with The Bane will try and kill him. (Both deceased, Book 1)
- Snare - One of King Gorger's generals and the Bane's father. Killed his other pups to give the Bane more milk. He was killed by his mate, Goldshard. (Deceased, Book 2)
- Bloodlet - One of King Gorger's followers in Gregor the Overlander.
- Clawsin - (mentioned, status unknown) Rat wounded by Bane. Ripred notes his allegiance with King Gorger in the first book. Allies with Ripred later.

== Crawlers ==
Cockroaches are referred to as crawlers in the Underland. Their names are derived from words pertaining to time. Very few members of other species are able to distinguish one crawler from another. Crawlers, along with gnawers, communicate with their Overland compatriots very readily. Gregor keeps trapping them in his "room".

- Temp - The first Underlander Gregor and Boots meet. Boots's best friend and constant companion in the Underland, appearing in every single book and in every quest. Temp is extremely loyal to Boots and very protective of her, as shown in The Prophecy of Bane, wherein he defends her from the Serpents, then saves her life in the Dead Land by sending her back to Regalia on a moth, staying behind at risk to his own life. He is also wise, in that he perceives what others do not and brings unconsidered possibilities to attention. For instance, in The Curse of the Warmbloods, he figures out that the cradle of the plague is not in the jungle. Temp also loses two legs. Similarly, in The Prophecy of Bane, he warns the others not to go to the island in the middle of the Waterway, which turns out to be inhabited with flesh-eating mites. Temp is chosen as the Crawler delegate to the peace conference at the end of the war. His name is derived from the word "tempus", the Latin word for time.
- Tick - Companion of Temp who was chosen as one of the two cockroaches to accompany Gregor on The Prophecy of Gray quest. Tick's name is an onomatopoeia of the sound produced by a clock. Like Temp, Tick was devoted to Boots. She died saving Temp and Boots by holding off the rats when the group was crossing a bridge in gnawer territory. (Deceased, Book 1)
- Min - The extremely old codebreaker of the crawlers in The Code of Claw. Her name is derived from the word minute.
- Pend - (mentioned) One of six crawlers who took Boots to the Regalian palace after being flown in by a moth ("flutterfly") into crawler territory.
- Lat - A crawler that was intended to be a sort-of crawler equivalent to King Gorger in the scrapped 6th book; “Gregor and the Underland’s Fall”. Their gender and personality are unknown.

== Nibblers ==
Mice are called nibblers in the Underland. They are very fond of geometry, and give their children names related to mathematics. Traditionally, they have been the human colonies' allies, which has complicated their relations with other species. Gnawers are openly hostile towards them, even embarking on a quest to exterminate the nibblers in the fourth novel. Mice are good fighters, but often choose not to resist the rats' moves against them because they perceive such attempts as pointlessly dangerous.

- Cartesian - Cartesian was first met in Gregor and The Marks of Secret, lying nearly-dead below a cliff in Hades Hall. He is the uncle of the baby mice found in a basket in the fourth book. He dies fighting to protect the nursery in The Code of Claw. (Deceased, Book 5)
- Cevian - A close friend to Luxa and Aurora. Cevian was the mouse who first found the two when they were forced to land in the Jungle, and was a faithful companion to Aurora while her wing healed. In Gregor and the Marks of Secret, she sends Luxa her crown as a request for help, but dies (presumably at the paws of a rat) before the princess can come to her aid. (Deceased, Book 4)
- Cube - A pup named by Luxa. He was recognized as one of the mice in the pit they watched die. (Deceased, Book 4)
- Heronian - Part of the code team. Also the nibbler representative at the end of Book 5. First mentioned by Cartesian as needed to break the code.
- Scalene, Newton, Root, and Euclidian - four pups who are being reunited with their families by Hazard in the Arena in the final novel.

== Spinners ==
Spiders are known as spinners. Their names seem to be related to weaving and to how they move; every (known) spider's name ends in the letters 'ox' or 'ex'. Their bodies are filled with a "strange blue liquid", though it is unknown whether this is their blood or some other substance. They "speak" by rubbing their legs over their chests to produce a humming sound; like cricket chirps, but with deeper and more varied pitches.

The spinners are known to be reluctant to take sides in Underland politics, though their reasoning is unclear. They have a low tolerance for noise and useless chatter (which they associate with political discussion), but they are never openly hostile towards other creatures. In Gregor and the Code of Claw, the spiders use their semi-neutral status to their advantage by aiding both sides of the war between the humans and gnawers, and thus endearing themselves to whoever might win. They eventually choose to fight with their longtime trading partners the humans, and against the rats who attacked them during Gregor the Overlander. This change of sides is considered an unprecedented achievement for the humans.

- Gox – A large orange spinner who joined up with the human quest to fulfill the "Prophecy of Gray". Though emotionless enough to consume her companion Treflex after his death, Gox proves herself a very valuable quest member. She is knowledgeable about her silk and the spinners' battle with the rats. In addition, she is more than willing to help other quest members. Without ever being asked, she spins silk slippers, cloths, diapers, and ropes and helps defend her companions when in danger. She is sliced in half by King Gorger during a moment of anger. (Deceased, Book 1)
- Treflex – Joined up with the questers en route to fulfill the "Prophecy of Gray", but died of exhaustion and wounds sustained in a battle with the rats nearly as soon as he arrived. She was the first quester to die. The small brown spider was consumed by Gox after his death. (Deceased, Book 1)
- Queen Wevox - Queen of the spinners, familiar with Vikus. She is a striped spider, and seems to command the respect and obedience of other spiders.
- Reflex- The code-breaker for the spiders in the Code of Claw. He is bright green, and, aside for his aptitude for codebreaking, is a fairly representative spinner.
- Purvox - Hazard's spinner tutor. She is described as a "beautiful red".

== Shiners ==
Fireflies are known as shiners in the Underland. They are very self-centered and argumentative creatures. Shiners have a love for cake, or any food in general, and are extremely lazy. For these reasons, other species often do not trust them, as it takes very little to sway their allegiance one way or the other. Females are only able to produce one color of light, while males can choose any hue they wish.

- Photos Glow-Glow (Fo-Fo) - A typically argumentative and gluttonous male shiner. He accompanies Gregor and his companions on the quest to kill the Bane until the food supplies run low. He deserts them and informs the rats of their approach in exchange for food and safe passage. Many of the original quest group meet him again in Hades Hall during the fourth novel. He also rescues Gregor in Gregor and the Code of Claw, after the death of Ares and the Bane.
- Zap - An unexceptional female shiner. Zap can glow only yellow. She shows very little compassion (like most of her species), but is moved by the sight of the dead mice in Book 4. In the final book, she gnaws the late Ares' claw off to separate him from his bond Gregor as part of an attempt to return "the warrior" to Regalia, after he has completed his final prophecy.

== Hissers ==
Lizards are known as hissers in the Underland.

- Frill - The only known hisser. A companion to Hamnet and his son Hazard in the jungle; she is killed by ants in The Curse of the Warmbloods. (Deceased, Book 3)

== Other species ==
Several other Underland species are mentioned in the series. The sentient species include moles known as diggers, scorpions called stingers, and ants called cutters. Twisters (snakes), slimers (snails), serpents (resembling eyeless plesiosaurs), flutterfly is also the word for moth and lobsters are also mentioned, as well as butterflies (their Underland-name is never mentioned) but their level of intelligence is unclear.
