= Suzanne Collins =

American author and television writer (born 1962)

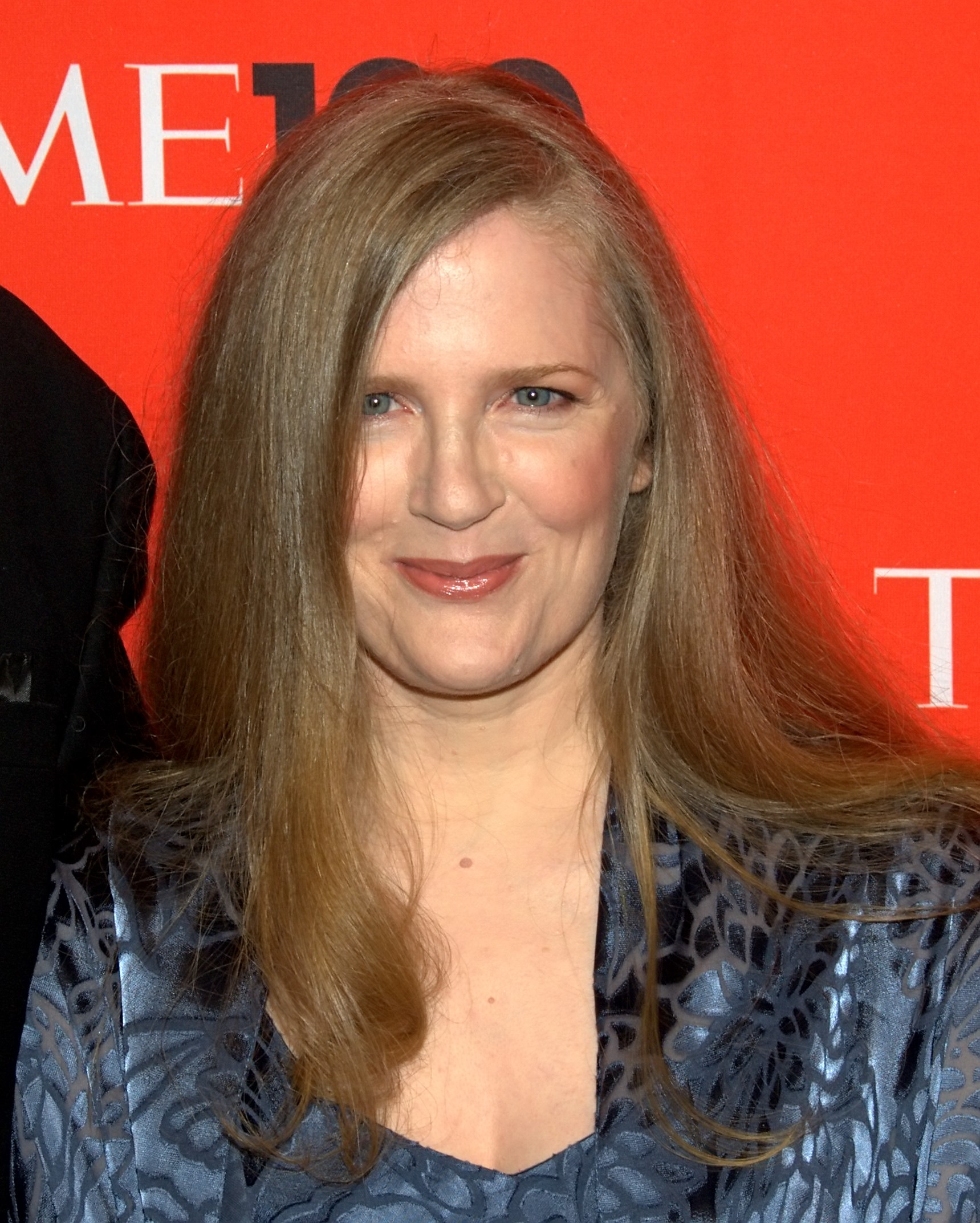
- Collins in 2010
- Born: August 10, 1962 (age 64); Hartford, Connecticut, U.S.
- Education: Indiana University Bloomington (BA); New York University (MFA)
- Occupations: Novelist; author
- Spouse: Charles Pryor (m. 1992)
- Children: 2
- Writing career
- Genres: Fantasy, science fiction, children's literature, young adult fiction, dystopian fiction
- Notable works: The Hunger Games; The Underland Chronicles
- Website: suzannecollinsbooks.com

Suzanne Collins (born August 10, 1962) is an American author and television writer who is best known as the author of the young adult dystopian fiction book series The Hunger Games. She is also the author of the children's fantasy series The Underland Chronicles.

== Early life and education ==
Collins was born on August 10, 1962, in Hartford, Connecticut, to Jane Brady Collins (born 1931) and Lieutenant Colonel Michael John Collins (1931–2003), a U.S. Air Force officer who served in the Korean and Vietnam War. Her grandfather and numerous uncles fought in both world wars. She is the youngest of four children, her older siblings being Kathryn (born 1957), Andrew (born 1958), and Joan (born 1960). As the daughter of a military officer, she moved with her family very often, mostly living in Europe (specifically Brussels) and the eastern part of America. As a young girl, Collins enjoyed reading, gymnastics, and exploring the woods with her friends.

Collins graduated from the Alabama School of Fine Arts in Birmingham in 1980 as a Theater Arts major. She completed her Bachelor of Arts degree from Indiana University Bloomington in 1985 with a double major in theater and telecommunications. In 1989, Collins earned her Master of Fine Arts in dramatic writing from the New York University Tisch School of the Arts.

== Career ==
Collins began her career in 1991 as a writer for children's television shows. She worked on several shows for Nickelodeon and Nick Jr., including Clarissa Explains It All, The Mystery Files of Shelby Woo, Little Bear, Oswald, and Wow! Wow! Wubbzy!. She was also the head writer for the PBS spin-off Clifford's Puppy Days. She received a Writers Guild of America nomination in animation for co-writing the critically acclaimed 2001 Christmas special, Santa, Baby! After meeting children's author James Proimos while working on the Kids' WB show Generation O!, Collins felt inspired to write children's books herself.

Her inspiration for Gregor the Overlander, the first book of The New York Times best-selling series The Underland Chronicles, came from Alice in Wonderland, when she was thinking about how one was more likely to fall down a manhole than a rabbit hole, and would find something other than a tea party. Between 2003 and 2007, she wrote the five books of the Underland Chronicles: Gregor the Overlander, Gregor and the Prophecy of Bane, Gregor and the Curse of the Warmbloods, Gregor and the Marks of Secret, and Gregor and the Code of Claw. During that time, Collins also wrote a rhyming picture book, When Charlie McButton Lost Power (2005), illustrated by Mike Lester.

In September 2008, Scholastic Press released The Hunger Games, the first book of a series by Collins. The Hunger Games was partly inspired by the Greek myth of Theseus and the Minotaur. Another inspiration was her father's career in the Air Force, which gave her insight to poverty, starvation, and the effects of war. In an interview, she stated that the idea came to her one night while flipping between reality TV channels and coverage of the Iraq War. The trilogy's second book, Catching Fire, was released in September 2009, and its third book, Mockingjay, was released on August 24, 2010. Within 14 months, 1.5 million copies of the first two Hunger Games books were printed in North America alone. The Hunger Games was on The New York Times Best Seller list for more than 60 consecutive weeks. Lions Gate Entertainment acquired worldwide distribution rights to a film adaptation of The Hunger Games, produced by Nina Jacobson's Color Force production company. Collins adapted the novel for film herself. Directed by Gary Ross, filming began in late spring 2011, with Jennifer Lawrence portraying main character Katniss Everdeen. as well as Josh Hutcherson who played Peeta Mellark and Liam Hemsworth who played Gale Hawthorne.

The subsequent two novels were adapted into films as well, with the latter book split into two cinematic installments, for a total of four films representing the three books. As a result of the popularity of The Hunger Games books, Collins was named one of Time magazine's most influential people of 2010. In March 2012, Amazon announced that she had become the best-selling Kindle author of all time. Amazon also revealed that Collins had written 29 of the 100 most highlighted passages in Kindle ebooks—and on a separate Amazon list of recently highlighted passages, she had written 17 of the top 20.

Collins released a Hunger Games prequel titled The Ballad of Songbirds and Snakes in May 2020. It is based on the life of future President Coriolanus Snow, 64 years before the events of The Hunger Games trilogy. A film adaptation, starring Tom Blyth as Snow and Rachel Zegler as Lucy Gray Baird, was released on November 17, 2023. In March 2025, it was followed by Sunrise on the Reaping, which explores the 50th Hunger Games won by Haymitch Abernathy. Lionsgate procured the rights to adapt the novel into a film, which was released on November 20, 2026, with Joseph Zada playing Haymitch and Ralph Fiennes playing Snow.

== Personal life ==
Collins moved to New York City in 1987 and lived there until 2003.

In 1991, Collins met Charles "Cap" Pryor at Indiana University and they married in 1992. Pryor has been supportive of Collins's career, reading and critiquing the earliest drafts of The Hunger Games. They live in the Sandy Hook area of Newtown, Connecticut, with their two children, Charlie and Isabel.

In 2013, Forbes reported that Collins has a net worth of $55 million, making her No. 3 on Forbes's Top-Earning Authors List.

== Awards ==
Work	Year	Award	Category	Result	Ref.
The Hunger Games	2008	Cybils Award	Speculative Fiction: Young Adult	Won	
The Hunger Games	2009–2010	Soaring Eagle Book Award		Won	
The Hunger Games	2009	Buckeye Children's & Teen Book Award		Won	
The Hunger Games	2009	Thumbs Up! Award		Won	
The Hunger Games	2009	Locus Award	Young Adult Novel	Nominated	
The Hunger Games	2009	Inky Awards	Silver Inky Award	Won	
The Hunger Games	2009	Golden Duck Award	Hal Clement Award	Won	
The Hunger Games	2010	Hampshire Book Awards	Book Award	Won	
The Hunger Games	2010	Kentucky Bluegrass Award	Grades 9-12	Won	
The Hunger Games	2010	Children's Book Award	Older Readers	Won	
The Hunger Games	2010	Children's Book Award	Overall	Won	
The Hunger Games	2010	Vermont Golden Dome Book Award		Won	
The Hunger Games	2011	California Young Reader Medal	Young Adult	Won	
The Hunger Games	2011	Rebecca Caudill Young Readers' Book Award		Won	
The Hunger Games	2011	Sequoyah Book Award	Young Adult and Intermediate	Won	
The Hunger Games	2011	Sequoyah Book Award	High School	Won	
The Hunger Games	2011	Geffen Award	Translated Science Fiction Novel	Won	
The Hunger Games	2012	2012 Teen Choice Awards	Choice Book	Won	
The Hunger Games	2012	Concorde Book Award		Won	
The Hunger Games	2012	BILBY Award	Older Readers Award	Won	
The Hunger Games (Film)	2013	Ray Bradbury Award		Finalist	
The Hunger Games (Film)	2012	Bram Stoker Award	Best Screenplay	Nominated	
Catching Fire	2009	Goodreads Choice Awards	Young Adult Series	Won	
Catching Fire	2010	Golden Duck Award	Hal Clement Award	Won	
Catching Fire	2010	Locus Award	Young Adult Novel	Nominated	
Catching Fire	2010	Indies Choice Book Awards	Young Adult	Won	
Catching Fire	2011–2012	Soaring Eagle Book Award		Won	
Catching Fire	2012	Geffen Award	Science Fiction	Won	
Catching Fire	2014	BILBY Award	Older Readers Award	Won	
Catching Fire	2018	Goodreads Choice Awards	Best of the Best	Nominated	
Mockingjay	2010	Goodreads Choice Awards	Young Adult Fantasy	Won	
Mockingjay	2011	Neffy Awards	SF/F Author	Won	
Mockingjay	2011	Children's Choice Book Awards	Teen Choice Book of the Year	Nominated	
Mockingjay	2011	Locus Award	Young Adult Novel	Nominated	
Mockingjay	2011	Andre Norton Award		Nominated	
Mockingjay	2013	Geffen Award	Young Adult	Won	
Mockingjay	2016	BILBY Award	Older Readers Award	Won	
The Ballad of Songbirds and Snakes	2020	Goodreads Choice Awards	Young Adult Fantasy	Nominated	
The Ballad of Songbirds and Snakes	2021	Geffen Award	Science Fiction	Won	
Sunrise on the Reaping	2025	Goodreads Choice Awards	Young Adult Fantasy & Sci-Fi	Won	
Sunrise on the Reaping	2025	Waterstones Book of the Year		Nominated	
Sunrise on the Reaping	2025	Dragon Awards	Best Young Adult/Middle Grade Novel	Won	
Sunrise on the Reaping	2025	Barnes & Noble Book of the Year Award		Nominated	
Sunrise on the Reaping	2026	British Book Awards	Children's Fiction Book of the Year	Won	
Year of the Jungle	2014	Christopher Award	Books for Young People - Kindergarten and up	Won	
Year of the Jungle	2014	Charlotte Zolotow Award		Honor	
Gregor the Overlander (aka: Gregor and the Rats of Underland)	2005	Beehive Book Award	Children's Fiction	Nominated	
Gregor the Overlander (aka: Gregor and the Rats of Underland)	2006	Waterstones Children's Book Prize	Best Book	Finalist	
Gregor the Overlander (aka: Gregor and the Rats of Underland)	2004	NAIBA Children's Novel Award		Won	

Other awards

- ALSC Notable Children's Recording (audio version)
- 2009: Publishers Weekly's Best Books of the Year: Children's Fiction for Catching Fire
- An American Library Association Top 10 Best Books For Young Adult Selection
- An ALA Notable Children's Book
- A Horn Book Fanfare
- NY Public Library 100 Titles for Reading and Sharing
- 2016: Authors Guild Award for Distinguished Service to the Literary Community (first time awarded to an author of young adult fiction)

== Published works ==
=== The Underland Chronicles ===
1. Gregor the Overlander (2003)
2. Gregor and the Prophecy of Bane (2004)
3. Gregor and the Curse of the Warmbloods (2005)
4. Gregor and the Marks of Secret (2006)
5. Gregor and the Code of Claw (2007)

=== The Hunger Games series ===
==== Original series ====
1. The Hunger Games (September 14, 2008)
2. Catching Fire (September 1, 2009)
3. Mockingjay (August 24, 2010)

==== Prequels ====
1. The Ballad of Songbirds and Snakes (May 19, 2020)
2. Sunrise on the Reaping (March 18, 2025)

=== Other books ===
- Fire Proof (The Mystery Files of Shelby Woo, #11) (1999)
- When Charlie McButton Lost Power (2005)
- Year of the Jungle (2013)
