= The Underland Chronicles =

Series of epic fantasy novels

- The cover of the first book.
- Gregor the Overlander (2003); The Prophecy of Bane (2004); The Curse of the Warmbloods (2005); The Marks of Secret (2006); The Code of Claw (2007)
- Author: Suzanne Collins
- Country: United States
- Language: English
- Genre: Adventure, Fantasy, Young adult, Drama, Science fiction, Epic
- Publisher: Scholastic Corporation
- Published: 2003–2007
- Media type: Print (hardback and paperback)

The Underland Chronicles is a series of five epic fantasy novels by Suzanne Collins, first published between 2003 and 2007. It tells the story of a boy named Gregor and his adventures in the "Underland", a subterranean world located under New York City. The Underland is inhabited by humans who traveled below hundreds of years ago, along with various giant versions of creatures like bats, cockroaches, and rats. According to the author, the series involves many topics relating to war, including biological warfare, genocide, and military intelligence.

While not as well known as the author's subsequent Hunger Games series, it has been reviewed favorably by many critics.

== Books ==
=== Gregor the Overlander ===
Gregor and his two-year-old sister Boots fall through a vent in their apartment basement and find themselves in a strange place called the Underland, inhabited by giant animals and pale humans. The Underlanders name Gregor "the warrior" and Boots the "princess" of a prophecy written hundreds of years ago by their founder, Bartholomew of Sandwich.

Gregor must go on a quest mentioned in the prophecy to save his lost father, a prisoner of war in a war between the humans and rats, known as "gnawers".

=== Gregor and the Prophecy of Bane ===
Gregor is caught up in one of Bartholomew of Sandwich's prophecies once again when Underlanders kidnap his baby sister for her protection, and he reluctantly returns to their subterranean world. The Regalians convince him to embark on a quest to kill a dangerous Rat called the Bane whom both the Rats and humans believe will lead the gnawers to conquer the Underland. Along the way, Gregor struggles to come to terms with the death of several friends; a newly discovered and very terrifying talent; and the morality of what the Underlanders have asked him to do.

=== Gregor and the Curse of the Warmbloods ===
A mysterious plague has broken out in the Underland, and yet another of Sandwich's prophecies leads the warm-blooded creatures of the realm to organize a quest for the cure, supposedly located in a dangerous underground for his friends and more than willing to help, especially as his own mother and bond lie dying in the Regalian hospital. The more they learn about the plague and the political situation of the Underland, however, the more the quest group begins to fear something worse than a simple disease.

=== Gregor and the Marks of Secret ===
The Bane takes control of the gnawers, and genocide is taking place in all corners of the Underland. The Rats drive the Mice out of their homes, killing any left behind. Gregor and his friends must fight to stop him. Gregor, now older and hardened from war, falls in love with Luxa. They sneak out of Regalia and find that the Rats have driven the Mice out of the jungle and the Fount, their last refuge. They follow a tunnel under the river to the Firelands, a subterranean volcanic wasteland, where the Mice have been driven. The air of the Firelands is toxic and ashy, and wipes out entire generations of the peaceful Mice. The Gnawers begin to move towards Regalia, to kill what remains of the Mice and their human protectors.

=== Gregor and the Code of Claw ===
The uneasy peace between the humans and gnawers has finally been broken, and everyone expects Gregor to accept his role as "the warrior" and act on his decision to support the humans. He soon finds his entire family drawn into Sandwich's deadly Prophecy of Time, and events around him begin to climax towards a final confrontation with The Bane. Gregor must fight to eliminate this threat to the Underland, and make hard choices about what he is willing to give up in the process.

== The Underland ==
The "Underland" is a subterranean realm populated by semi-albino humans and large, intelligent rodents, insects, and other creatures (though not all Underland creatures are sentient). It is located under New York, with most of its entrances leading out to what is now New York City. In the first novel, a character named Vikus tells Gregor (the protagonist) that the Underland humans are descended from a group of "Overlanders" who, led by a man named Bartholomew of Sandwich, settled underground over a period of some fifty years. Sandwich was a self-styled prophet who believed that a great tragedy would one day befall all those living on the surface, and convinced his devoted followers to establish an underground community long before the event could happen.

In Gregor and the Marks of Secret, Gregor discovers that Underland children know the old song "Bat, Bat, Come Under my Hat", suggesting that it was carried down by their Overland ancestors. This song is an actual poem, which some sources claim was developed by a group known as the Conch, who were early Bahamian settlers of Florida. Other sources state that it is an English folk rhyme, so old that its author is unknown. In any case, the rhyme has clearly been in existence since at least the mid-1700s, and thus gives a clue to the time period when the Underland was first settled by humans. It also provides clues as to how the first Underland humans were able to ally themselves so quickly with the fliers, as "Bat, Bat" portrays them in a positive light, though modern Overlanders do not necessarily picture bats in a positive way.

The creatures of the Underland are divided into many factions, which frequently clash with one another. In general, the humans are allied with the fliers (bats) and nibblers (mice); the gnawers (rats) are their mortal enemies. Aside from the cutters (ants who despise all warm-blooded creatures), most other species are neutral and keep to themselves. Non-human creatures tend to view humans in a negative light, because of their tendency to take what they want and apologize later. This behavior is exemplified by a story which Gregor learns of in the final book, detailing how the humans' first act in the Underland was to poison an entire species living on the land that would become Regalia. Gregor (and his little sister Boots) spends time with many different creatures over the course of the series, and comes to believe that the humans' xenophobia and unwavering trust in Sandwich's judgment are both wrong and dangerous to everyone in the Underland.

Though the Underlanders have many peculiar mannerisms and traditions, they are very similar to their counterparts who live above. The humans speak a dialect of English, raise crops and livestock, and even hold sporting events. Their physical appearance, culture, and level of technology are the main differences from Overlanders. Underland humans are a necessarily warlike race, but their fighting methods are most similar to those of the Medieval Ages due to an inability to mass-produce explosive material, like gunpowder. However, they are fairly advanced in other areas, such as the field of medicine. Regalian culture revolves around defending their "light", both literally and figuratively, as they use the word "light" as an idiom for "life". Underland humans and their bonds are always prepared for a fight, and rarely host cultural events unrelated to their continued survival.

=== Bonding ===
Underland humans developed the tradition known as "bonding" shortly after their arrival in the Underland, and have put it into constant use since then (primarily with fliers). When two creatures bond, they are bound together forever through a formal promise to defend the other. In the dangerous environment of the Underland, this is a coveted and extremely serious relationship. The punishment for forsaking a bondmate — referred to as one's "bond" — is banishment alone in the Dead Lands, which means almost certain death.

Very rarely, one can be bonded to more than one creature; in Luxa's case, she was able to bond to both Ripred the gnawer and Aurora the flier. Each of a pair of bonding creatures must recite an oath in front of an official gathering, which is often followed by a celebration. The oath is as follows:

(Bondmate's name) the (species name), I bond to you.
Our life and death are one, we two.
In dark, in flame, in war, in strife
I save you as I save my life.
