= Gregor the Overlander =

2003 book by Suzanne Collins

- First edition
- Author: Suzanne Collins
- Cover artist: Daniel Craig
- Language: English
- Series: The Underland Chronicles
- Genre: Fantasy
- Publisher: Scholastic
- Publication date: September 1, 2003
- Publication place: United States
- Pages: 336
- ISBN: 978-0-439-67813-1
- OCLC: 66527121
- Followed by: Gregor and the Prophecy of Bane

Gregor the Overlander is a children's epic fantasy novel. The book was written by Suzanne Collins and was published in 2003 as the first book of The Underland Chronicles. It was received well by critics, and was listed as one of the New York Public Library's 100 Books for Reading and Sharing. It was featured by National Public Radio in 2005.

The novel has been published in several languages and is available as both an audiobook and ebook. Its United Kingdom edition was published under the alternative title Gregor and the Rats of Underland.

== Plot summary ==
Eleven-year-old Gregor is left home alone in his family's New York City apartment to watch his sisters and grandmother. When Gregor's baby sister Boots falls through an old air duct grate in the building's basement, he dives in after her. The two fall miles below into the Underland: a subterranean world home to humans with near-translucent skin, violet eyes, and silver hair; giant sentient bats, rodents, and insects; and an escalating conflict between the human kingdom of Regalia and the rats' King Gorger. They meet several "Underlanders", among them the human Regalians' crown princess Luxa, who is Gregor's age; her cousin Henry, aged 14; and the bats who are "bonded" to them as warrior allies. At first, Gregor wants only to return home, but when he is attacked by two rats during an escape attempt and saved by the Underlanders, he inadvertently brings the conflict between the two groups to a head.

It is then that he learns the real reason for the rats' hatred of Overlanders: a mysterious prophecy written by the human colony's founder Bartholomew of Sandwich hints that an Overland "warrior" will stop an attempt by the rats to take over the underground realm once and for all. The Regalian council believes Gregor to be this warrior, and tries to convince him to undertake the quest mentioned in the "Prophecy of Gray". Though he sympathizes, Gregor is reluctant to help until he learns a surprising fact: his father, who disappeared unexpectedly over two years before, had actually fallen down into Regalia just like Gregor and Boots and been taken prisoner by the rats. Gregor, his sister, and a group of Regalians go on a journey to rescue Gregor's father and recruit allies for a war against the rats.

The quest group is challenged to successfully recruit allies for the Regalians, along the way facing battles with giant spiders, scorpions, and rats. The group of children are left in the care of the rat Ripred, who is a rebel against King Gorger. The group journeys to find Gregor's dad emaciated and tortured in the personal prison of King Gorger. When the rat king discovers their rescue attempt, Henry reveals that he has been helping the rats all along, hoping to ally them with the Regalians and genocide the weaker species of the realm. During the questers' attempt to escape, Gregor sacrifices himself to lure the rats' attack force — King Gorger and Henry among them — off the edge of a cliff. Henry's bat Ares, who had no knowledge of his bond's treachery, chooses to save Gregor rather than Henry as they fall. King Gorger, Henry, and hundreds of rats perish in the fall. When the few remaining quest members make it back to Regalia, Luxa and her family are devastated, both because of Henry's treason and death, and because Ares has been sentenced to banishment for allowing his bond to die. Gregor saves his life by using his status as the "warrior" to form a new bond with him. When things have settled down somewhat and the Regalian doctors have done all they can for his father, Gregor, his sister and his father return to the surface and reunite with his family.

=== The Prophecy of Gray ===
Beware, Underlanders, time hangs by a thread
The hunters are hunted, white water runs red.
The gnawers will strike to extinguish the rest.
The hope of the hopeless resides in a quest.

Meaning: The usually uneasy balance of power in the Underland is in flux, with the rats' king planning to launch an attack against the other species in the Underland. The phrase "white water runs red" refers specifically to how the humans deposit the bodies of two rats who try to kill Gregor into a fast-flowing river beneath the Regalian palace. "Hope of the hopeless" may be interpreted as a reference to Gregor, who refuses to "allow himself to think about the future at all", because it makes him sad as he has made rule, thinking if he thinks good thoughts they are never to happen. He made this rule after he lost his father.

An Overlander warrior, a son of the sun,
May bring us back light, he may bring us back none.
But gather your neighbors and follow his call
Or rats will most surely devour us all.

Meaning: Gregor is an Overlander and the son of another fallen Overlander (thus a "son" of the "sun", in multiple ways). He brings the Regalians "light" (an Underland idiom for "life") by killing King Gorger and the traitor Henry. The humans ally themselves with the other species of their world, warding off an attack by the rats, who are carnivores and occasionally cannibalistic.

Two over, two under, of royal descent,
Two fliers, two crawlers, two spinners assent.
One gnawer beside and one lost up ahead.
And eight will be left when we count up the dead.

Meaning: Gregor and Boots; Luxa and Henry; the bats Ares and Aurora; two giant cockroaches named Temp and Tick; the spiders Gox and Treflex; and the rat Ripred all journey on a quest to find the "one lost up ahead": Gregor's dad. Out of the original twelve, Tick, Treflex, Gox, and Henry all die during the quest.

The last who will die must decide where he stands.
The fate of the eight is contained in his hands.
So bid him take care, bid him look where he leaps,
As life may be death, and death life again reaps.

Meaning: Henry, the last "quester" to die, decides that he is a traitor to the humans, and seals his fate by failing to notice as Gregor leads him off a cliff. He may be interpreted as controlling the "fate of the eight" because of his powerful connection with the rats, whom he could have manipulated had he lived. The final line may have many different meanings; among them may be a hint about how miserable Luxa is even though she lives, as Henry was her best friend until he had his life "reaped".

== Characters ==
- Gregor: An ordinary eleven-year-old boy from New York City, is meant to be the warrior mentioned in "The Prophecy of Gray". He is later bonded to Ares the flier who was betrayed by Henry.
- Boots (Margaret): Boots is Gregor's two-year-old sister. She accidentally discovers the entrance to the Underland. She is the only reason they decide to come on the quest.
- Luxa: The future queen of the Underland, about the same age as Gregor. Her parents were killed by rats shortly after Henry's. She is bonded to Aurora the flier.
- Vikus: The leader of the quest and Luxa's Grandfather. During the quest, he leaves them, and they have to continue the quest without Vikus's advice.
- Henry: Luxa's cousin, next in line to the throne after her. He wants to ally with the rats to conquer the "weak" species of the Underland. He dies chasing Gregor off the edge of a cliff, believing his bond Ares would catch him.
- Ripred: A gnawer (rat) with deadly fighting skills and intelligence; Vikus asks him to help the quest group into the rats' domain. Ripred in the later books teaches Gregor to learn how to use echolocation.
- Temp: One of two crawlers (cockroaches) to join the quest. He is one of the first crawlers who encounters Boots and her brother and befriends the two.
- Tick: A friend of Temp who sacrifices herself to save Boots from a group of rats.
- Ares: A large black flier (bat) bonded to Henry who chooses to save Gregor rather than his bond when the two fall off a cliff. He does not know of Henry's treachery until after the fact, and so Gregor decides to bond with him to save him from banishment.
- Aurora: A flier who is bonded to Luxa. She has a golden coat.
- Gox and Treflex: Two spinners (spiders) who help the quest group.
- Gregor's dad: Though never named, Gregor's father is an important member of the quest because he is the one that the group goes to find and rescue.

== Publication ==
Several editions of the novel have been published since the first in 2003, each with new or adapted cover art. To date, editions have appeared in German, French, Spanish, Norwegian, Italian, Polish, Greek, Dutch, Finnish, and Chinese. Scholastic has also licensed the novel's rights to publishers in several other languages. In 2006 The Chicken House produced yet another edition, distributed in the UK by Gardners Books. This edition was published under the alternate title Gregor and the Rats of the Underland.

The novel was available as an ebook as early as 2010, and as part of a boxed set. An audiobook edition was published December 13, 2005, read by actor and narrator Paul Boehmer.

School Library Journal called it "an engrossing adventure for fantasy fans and for those new to the genre." Common Sense Media gave it a 5/5 and credited the book's "strong characters, vivid descriptions, flawless pacing, breathless excitement, laughs and scares, and a vision that makes this fantasy very different."

The book has also been praised for covering political themes, such as war and genocide, while still maintaining an adventurous feeling. Collins herself has stated that "she spent hours ... plotting strategic alliances that would make military sense" in a way that kept such themes accessible for younger audiences. Publishers Weekly's review of the novel was "starred", an honor reserved for books of "exceptional merit". The reviewer stated, "Collins does a grand job of world-building, with a fine economy of words-no unnecessary details bog down either the setting or the invigorating story. In her world, a child singing "Patty-Cake" can change the course of history and a stoic rat can mourn the fact that although he is able to read, he cannot write because he has no thumb. Unlike Gregor who cannot wait to leave, readers will likely find it to be a fantastically engaging place."

Despite the mainly positive reviews, the novel has received some negative criticism. One critical review by Children's Literature writer Tina Gregory points out that "the novel lacks at certain points necessary descriptive details of the characters and settings. For instance, the descriptions of Regalia, the Underland city, and many of the book's characters should be so distinct that we visualize them." The same School Library Journal review which praised the novel's "exciting scenes and cliff-hanger chapters" also had this to say: "Gregor is not the most compelling figure at first, but as the story progresses he becomes more interesting, maturing through the challenges he faces."

== Awards ==
Gregor the Overlander was named a Kirkus Reviews Editors' Choice and placed third for the Nutmeg Children's Book Award in 2006 in the intermediate category. It was also nominated for the Kansas William Allen White Children's Book Award, the Pacific Northwest Young Reader's Choice Award, and several other awards. It won the Pennsylvania Young Readers' Choice Award for 2005–2006 and was the first runner-up for the Texas Bluebonnet Award. It was also awarded the Notable Children's Recordings Award in 2006.
