= Gregor and the Prophecy of Bane =

2004 book by Suzanne Collins

- First edition
- Author: Suzanne Collins
- Cover artist: Daniel Craig
- Language: English
- Series: The Underland Chronicles
- Genre: Fantasy
- Publisher: Scholastic
- Publication date: September 1, 2004
- Publication place: United States
- Pages: 320
- ISBN: 0-439-65075-5
- OCLC: 54500311
- LC Class: PZ7.C6837 Gre 2004
- Preceded by: Gregor the Overlander
- Followed by: Gregor and the Curse of the Warmbloods

Gregor and the Prophecy of Bane is the second book in Suzanne Collins's children's novel series The Underland Chronicles. Published in 2004, the novel contains elements of high fantasy. The novel focuses on a prophecy mentioned at the end of Gregor the Overlander which the Underlanders believe requires the protagonist Gregor to hunt down and kill an evil white rat known as the "Bane". The novel has been praised as a sequel and for showing the maturation of Gregor in the face of continually dark events.

Several editions have been published, including standalone paperbacks and hardcovers and a paperback boxed set including all five books of the series. Listening Library published an audiobook version read by Paul Boehmer on April 11, 2006. The novel has also been released as an ebook, and is available from various online stores.

== Plot summary ==
Several months have passed since the events of the first novel, when Gregor and his baby sister Boots first fell into the subterranean kingdom of Regalia (a part of the "Underland") and undertook a quest to save their father, who was being held prisoner by a group of Underland rats. The Underland humans supported the siblings' mission because they believed it was prophesied by their founder, Bartholomew of Sandwich. At the beginning of the second novel, the Underland humans kidnap Boots to force her and Gregor (whom they call the "Warrior") to participate in another one of their prophecies. They interpret "The Prophecy of Bane" to mean that Gregor must kill a white rat (the "Bane") in order to prevent the humans' main enemies, the rats, from taking over the realm. A set of lines about a dying baby "turn[ing] the Warrior weak" convince the humans that Boots is in danger, and so the Regalians offer to protect Boots in within the walls of their castle. Gregor sails off on an underground ocean with only a few soldiers and their giant bats to hunt the Bane in the Labyrinth, an uncharted maze of caverns deep in the Underland's rat lands.

During their journey, the quest members are caught in a whirlpool, encounter an island of carnivorous insects, which results in Howard's bat, Pandora, being eaten alive, and are betrayed by the two shiners (fireflies) who were hired to provide them with light. Gregor himself begins to struggle with a new "power" that manifests when he is in battle. He is what the Underland creatures call a "rager", a person who is overcome by a kind of "battle-fury" when they fight, making them completely deadly even without training. Gregor and his bond Ares' (Note: A human and bat "bond" by swearing to defend each other to the death. Breaking this oath is one of the most serious offenses an Underlander can commit. Gregor became Ares's bond during the first novel to save the bat from punishment after Ares broke his oath with his previous bond, the traitor Henry.) worst trouble, however, is when they and the remaining questers become separated from the human queen Luxa, the cockroach Temp, and Boots during a fight with some serpents. The three missing are assumed dead, and Gregor finds himself emotionally frozen at the thought of having lost his baby sister.

When he and Ares finally find the Bane, he learns that it is not an adult monster, as was assumed, but instead a baby rat whose parents killed each other in battle. He can not bring himself to kill it, and so he and Ares take it to be raised by the only friendly rat they know: Ripred. After this, the two return to Regalia, where Nerissa, Luxa's cousin, has just been crowned queen. (Note: Luxa, the Regalian crown princess, was next in line to the throne. After her apparent death during the quest, her cousin Nerissa is the next in line. Nerissa is crowned immediately because she is already of age, unlike Luxa.) The surviving quest members–the bat Andromeda, human Howard, Ares, and Gregor–are tried for treason because they failed to kill the Bane. They are saved, though, by Nerissa, who controversially decrees it is good that Gregor was not heartless enough to kill a baby. (Note: Nerissa re-interprets the lines about a baby's death in "The Prophecy of Bane" to explain that Gregor would have been morally wrong had he murdered a baby, and thus not someone the humans could count on to make sound judgements in the future.) Shortly thereafter, Gregor is finally trying to face the reality of going home without Boots when she is suddenly returned to the palace, having been saved by Luxa, Temp, and an unnamed moth. The two then return to the surface world.

== Characters ==
=== Quest Members ===
- Gregor: An eleven-year-old Overlander, said to be the warrior mentioned in "The Prophecy of Bane".
- Boots (Margaret): Boots is Gregor's two-year-old sister. She is known as "the princess" by the crawlers (cockroaches).
- Howard: Luxa's cousin, brought along for his skills in water aid. He is bonded to Pandora.
- Mareth: A soldier and friend of Gregor, severely injured during the fight with the serpents. He is bonded to Andromeda.
- Twitchtip: A gnawer (rat) Ripered sends along because of her incredible sense of smell; she is an outcast and "scent-seer".
- Temp: A crawler and friend of Boots. He is lost during the battle with the serpents, then later loses two legs while escaping some rats with Boots. He remains behind to regrow them while she is sent ahead.
- Photos Glow-Glow and Zap: Two hired fireflies who desert the quest and inform the rats of the quest's approach when their pay (large quantities of food) runs out.
- Ares: A large black flier (bat) bonded to Gregor. He is extremely strong, and similar to Gregor in many ways; the two become friends.
- Pandora: Howard's bond, eaten alive by carnivorous mites.
- Andromeda: Mareth's bond.
- Aurora: Not technically part of the quest, Aurora is bonded to Luxa and accompanies her to join the quest after the boats carrying the members are too far from land for them to be sent home. She is lost and presumed dead after the battle with the serpents.
- Luxa: The rebellious future queen of Regalia. She is not officially a quest member as she joins after they have already set out, and is lost with Aurora after the battle with the serpents.

== Publication ==
Scholastic has licensed rights to publish in 20 different languages. As of 2018, editions have been published in Italian, Turkish, German, Portuguese, Bulgarian, Finnish, Spanish, Danish, Dutch, Swedish, French, Greek, Norwegian, Polish, Persian, and Chinese. Many foreign-language editions have titles different from the typical English translation, such as the Dutch Het Labyrint ("The Labyrinth") and Portuguese Gregor e a Segunda Profecia ("Gregor and the Second Prophecy"). The second United States English edition (ISBN 9780545515016), released in 2013 as part of a boxed set, has cover art by Vivienne To. New United Kingdom editions, published in 2013 (ISBN 9781407137049) and 2016 (ISBN 9781407172590), respectively, have different cover art.

The novel has also been released in ebook and audiobook form. Multiple editions have been published in most languages; for example, audiobooks, paperbacks, and hardcovers have been published in English, German, and Spanish. The English audiobook published April 11, 2006 is read by actor Paul Boehmer.

The book's lexile score is 680L, making it appropriate for child readers in the 4th-6th grades. Scholastic, the book's publisher, recommends the novel for children in grades 3–8.

== Reception ==
Gregor and the Prophecy of Bane received critical acclaim, especially for its treatment of difficult issues in a way that is accessible for young readers. VOYA reviewer Nancy K. Wallace notes the discussions of revenge, murder, and betrayal. She remarks on how Gregor is "prepared to heartlessly slaughter The Bane" yet overcomes his "hatred for the rats that killed his sister", but must still "face charges of treason" for his apparent betrayal of his duties. Timnah Card of the Bulletin of the Center for Children's Books describes how Gregor is "disturbed to discover his unsuspected capacities as a warrior". In a similar way, the book's Kirkus Reviews review notes the way that "humor and terror alternate" throughout the story. The Children's Cooperative Book Center (CCBC) of the University of Wisconsin–Madison wrote "Scenes...range from fast to funny to deliciously frightening. Gregor also faces several moral choices. As in the first volume of The Underland Chronicles, there is plenty of humor and plenty of intense action in this riveting, fast-paced novel."

More generally, School Library Journal said, "This is a strong choice for fantasy fans, including reluctant readers, even if they're not familiar with Gregor's first adventure." Kathy L. Fiedler of the Kutztown University Book Review called the novel "a hit with young readers, especially those who've enjoyed The City of Ember by Jeanne DuPrau". Several critics, including Publishers Weekly, lauded the novel specifically as a sequel to the well-received Gregor the Overlander. Wallace calls Gregor and the Prophecy of Bane a "welcome sequel", going on to state that "on the last page, the scene is skillfully set for [further sequels]". The Horn Book Magazine similarly stated, "Gregor’s fans will cheer the promise of future visits." On a more negative note, Peg Glisson writes for Children's Literature that "those who have not read the first Gregor will be at a slight disadvantage. Collins tries to weave necessary details from Gregor's first visit to the Underworld into this one, but it definitely slows the early chapters down and is not completely satisfying." Ed Sullivan of Booklist claims "...fans will not be disappointed with this exciting, action-packed sequel", although he also warns "readers unfamiliar with the first novel will be at a disadvantage [as] Collins assumes knowledge of the characters and developments from the first book".

The CCBC also praised the book for its portrayal of strong and healthy sibling relationships as it "[continued] the saga of two contemporary siblings navigating their way through unfamiliar territory". Card says, "Gregor's parents' inability to care for their children after the return of his father in the first book sets the stage for this second journey, in which the counsel of adults is well meant but morally ambiguous and Gregor's own wisdom must carry the day. That continuing realism wraps the mile-a-minute adventure in a satisfyingly complex political and social network and provides the whole with a compelling emotional foundation. Throughout, the motivations and growth of individual characters drive the action..." Glisson writes as well of how Gregor has "matured since his last adventure" and "learns to deal with the fact that he is a "rager," a deadly and efficient fighter."

Gregor and the Prophecy of Bane was on the New York Times and Book Sense Bestseller lists. It was also a Book Sense Children's Pick for 2005. The book has received several other awards as well. In 2005, it was a Connecticut Book Award Finalist and a Cooperative Children's Book Center recommended book. In 2007, it was nominated for the Sequoyah Children's Book Award, but did not win.
