= The Cloisters (novel) =

2022 novel

- U.S. first edition cover
- Author: Katy Hays
- Language: English
- Genre: Bildungsroman; Gothic fiction; Thriller; Campus novel
- Published: 2022
- Publisher: Atria Books
- Publication place: United States
- Media type: Print (hardback)
- Pages: 312 (hardback edition)
- ISBN: 9781668004401
- OCLC: 1313668354

The Cloisters is the debut novel by Katy Hays. It was published by Atria Books, an imprint of Simon & Schuster, in November 2022.

== Plot ==
Ann Stilwell, a recent college graduate from Washington state who is recovering from the hit-and-run death of her father, arrives in New York expecting to intern for the summer at the Metropolitan Museum of Art. Instead she is assigned to The Cloisters, a department of the Met that specialises in medieval art. She joins Rachel Mondray, a wealthy and well-connected fellow intern, under the leadership of the curator Patrick Roland. The small team is preparing for an exhibition on divination in the Renaissance.

Ann also meets Leo, a gardener at The Cloisters. Leo grows medieval and Renaissance plants, many of them medicinal or poisonous. Ann finds Leo attractive and enters into a tentative relationship with him; at the same time she is bewitched by Rachel's charisma and Patrick's scholarly expertise. She is gradually drawn into their inner circle, which focuses on an old Tarot deck, with which both Patrick and Rachel carry out readings. Ann is introduced to Patrick Ketch, a rare book and antiques dealer in downtown Manhattan.

== Reception ==
The book has been likened to Donna Tartt's The Secret History, which also takes place in an academic setting. It has been praised as an "outstanding" and "accomplished" debut novel. The Guardian called it a "satisfyingly brutal tale" that "skilfully [navigated] the narrow territory between suspense and melodrama". The New York Times acknowledged its "dense forest of a plot", though noted that "some pathways [trailed] off without sufficient resolution", a criticism that was mirrored by The Observer, who considered that the story was "not always sturdily constructed".
