= List of waterfalls by type =

The following is a list of waterfalls by type.

- Plunge: Water descends vertically, losing contact with the bedrock surface.
- Horsetail: Descending water maintains some contact with bedrock.
- Cataract: A large, powerful waterfall.
- Multi-step: A series of waterfalls one after another of roughly the same size each with its own sunken plunge pool.
- Block: Water descends from a relatively wide stream or river.
- Cascade: Water descends a series of rock steps.
- Segmented: Distinctly separate flows of water form as it descends.
- Tiered: Water drops in a series of distinct steps or falls.
- Punchbowl: Water descends in a constricted form and then spreads out in a wider pool.
- Fan: Water spreads horizontally as it descends while remaining in contact with bedrock.

Some waterfalls are also distinct in that they do not flow continuously. Ephemeral waterfalls only flow after a rain or a significant snowmelt.

== Plunge ==
Water descends vertically, losing contact with the bedrock surface.

=== Australia ===
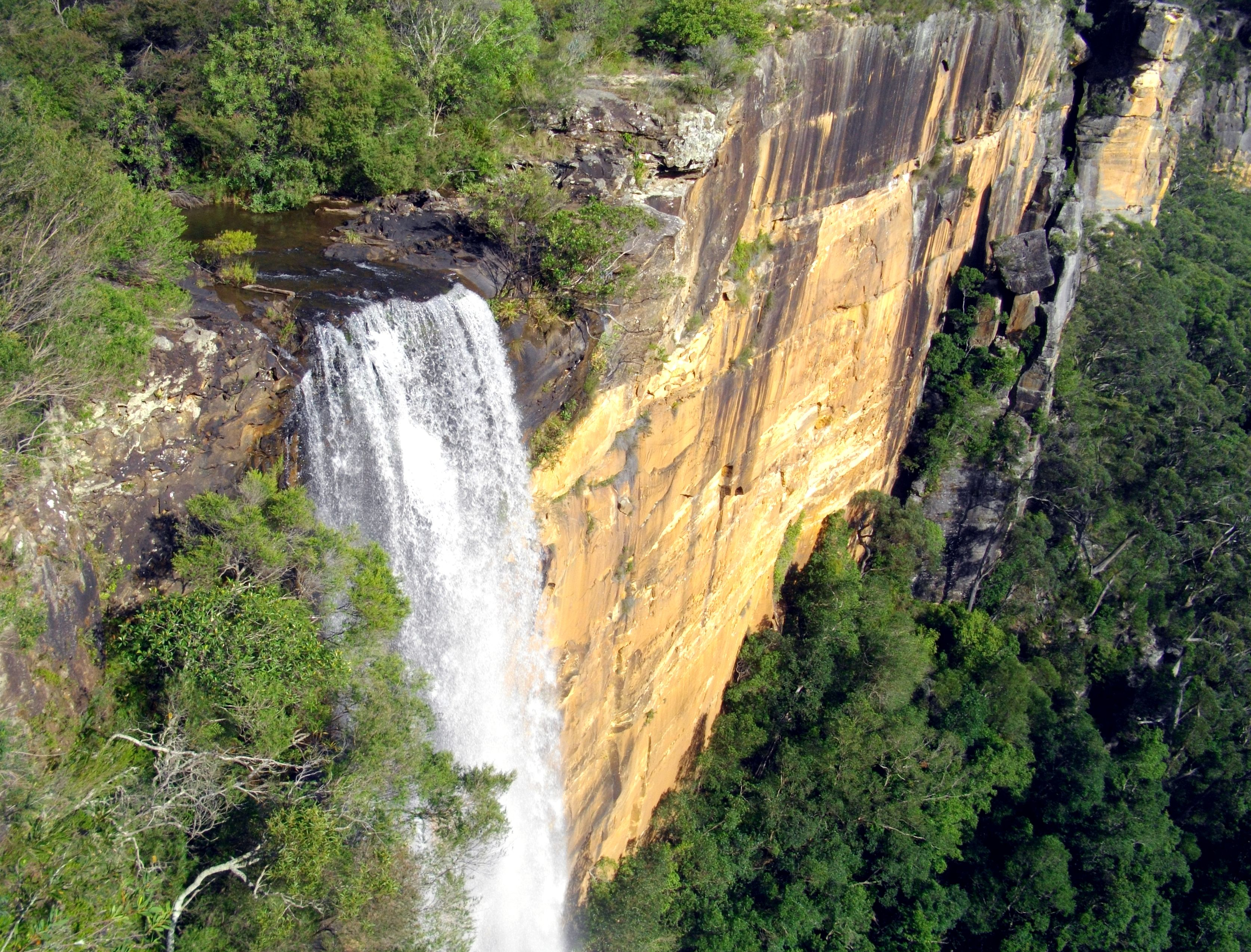
Fitzroy Falls

- Blencoe Falls
- Curtis Falls
- Dangar Falls
- Delaneys Falls
- Ellenborough Falls
- Fitzroy Falls
- Hopetoun Falls
- Jim Jim Falls
- Millaa Millaa Falls
- Philosopher Falls
- Purlingbrook Falls
- Queen Mary Falls
- Tolmer Falls
- St Georges Falls
- Wallaman Falls
- Yabba Falls

=== Bangladesh ===
- Madhabkunda waterfall

=== Brazil ===
- Cachoeira da Fumaça
- Caracol falls

=== Canada ===
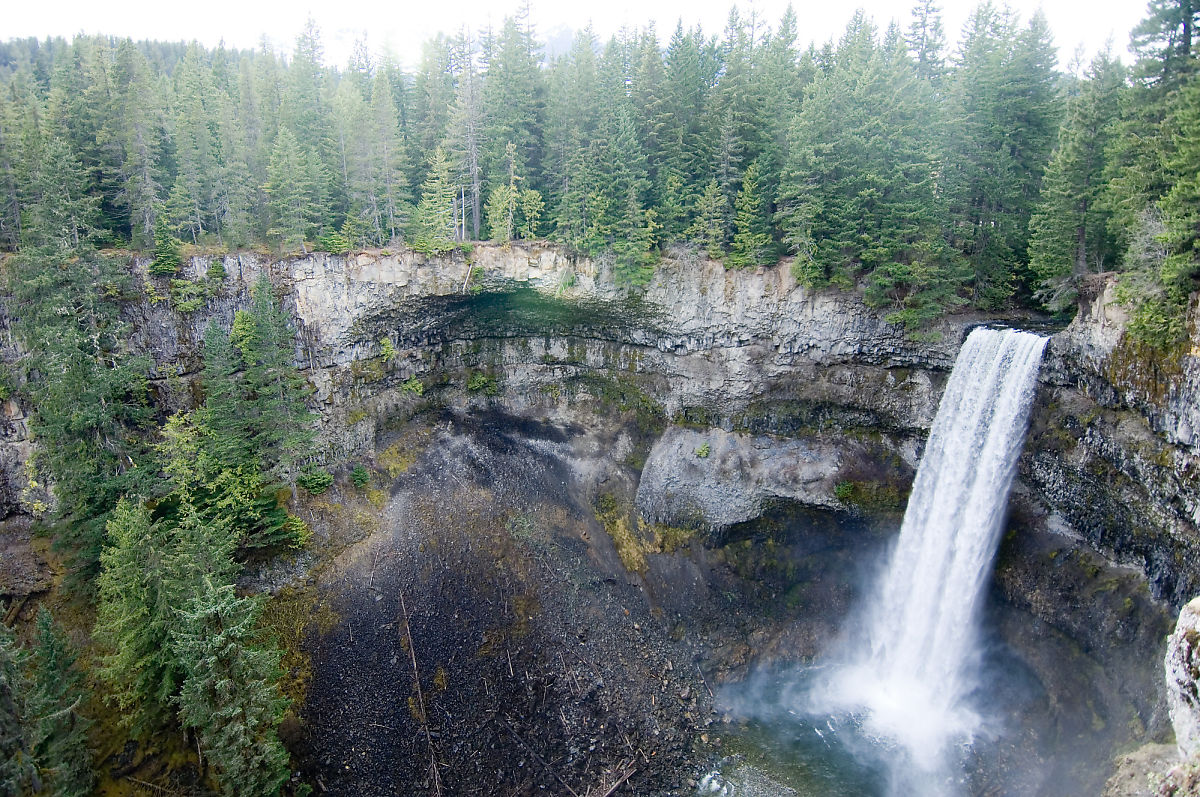
Brandywine Falls

- Brandywine Falls
- Bridal Veil Falls
- Chute Kabir Kouba
- Grand Falls
- Helmcken Falls
- Horseshoe Falls
- Hunlen Falls
- Kakabeka Falls
- Panther Falls
- Pissing Mare Falls
- Sandy Pond Falls
- Spahats Creek Falls

=== Costa Rica ===
- La Fortuna Waterfall
- La Paz Waterfall

=== Estonia ===
- Jägala Falls
- Keila Falls
- Valaste Falls

=== Finland ===
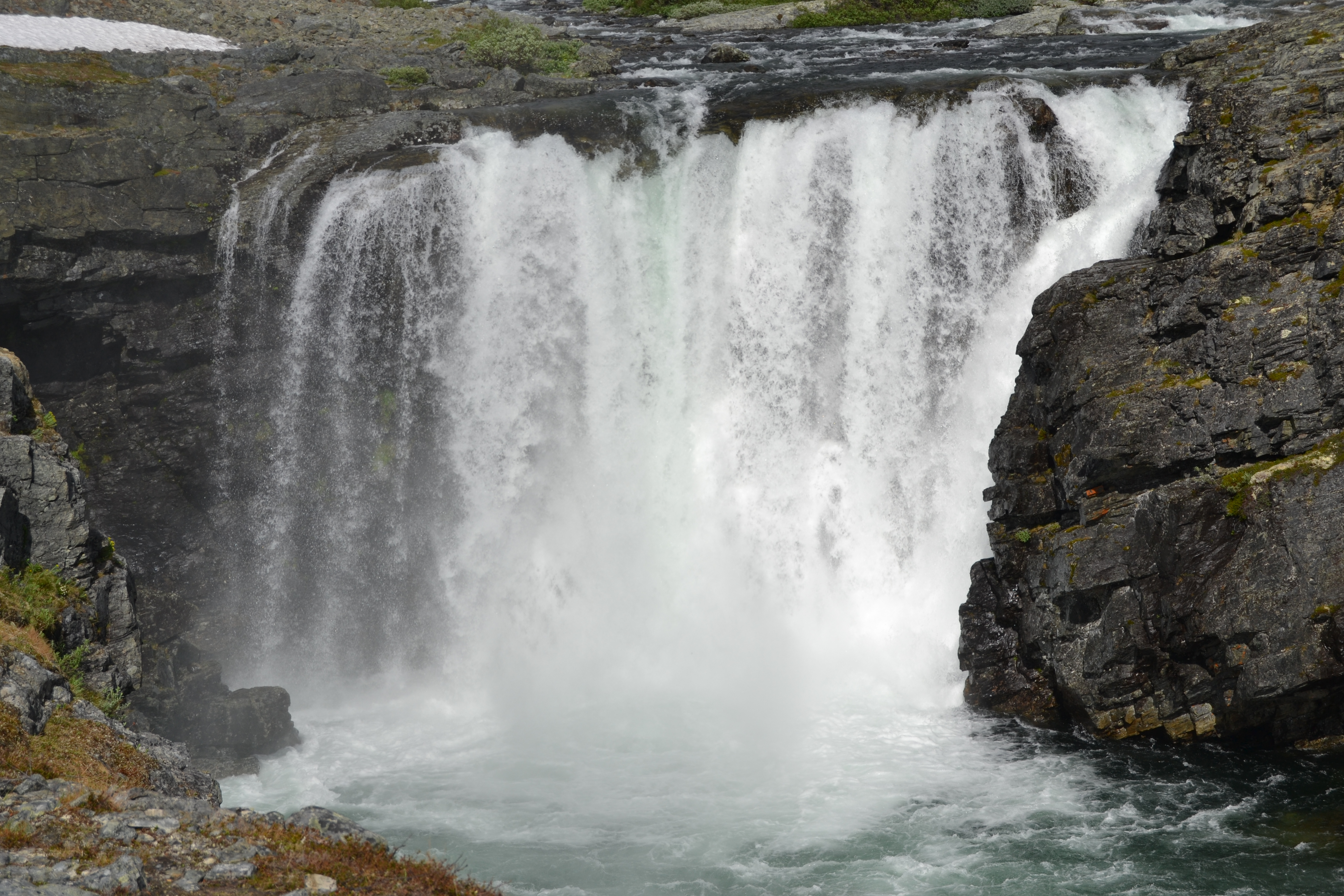
Pitsusköngäs, a plunge-type waterfall in Enontekiö, Finland.

- Kitsiputous
- Pitsusköngäs

=== France ===
- Carbet Falls
- Trou de Fer

=== Guyana ===
- Kaieteur Falls

=== Hungary ===
- Lillafüred

=== Iceland ===
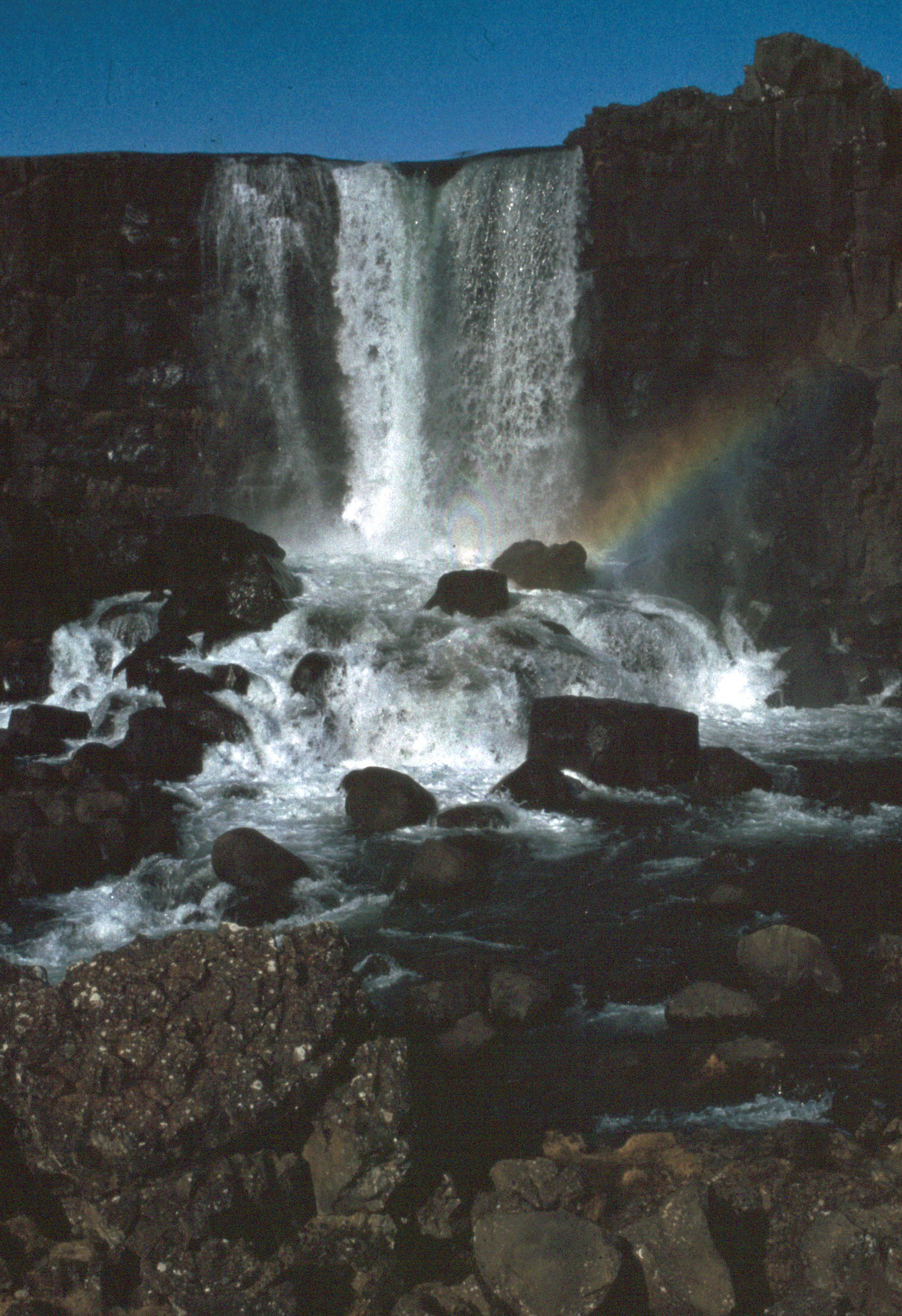
Öxarárfoss

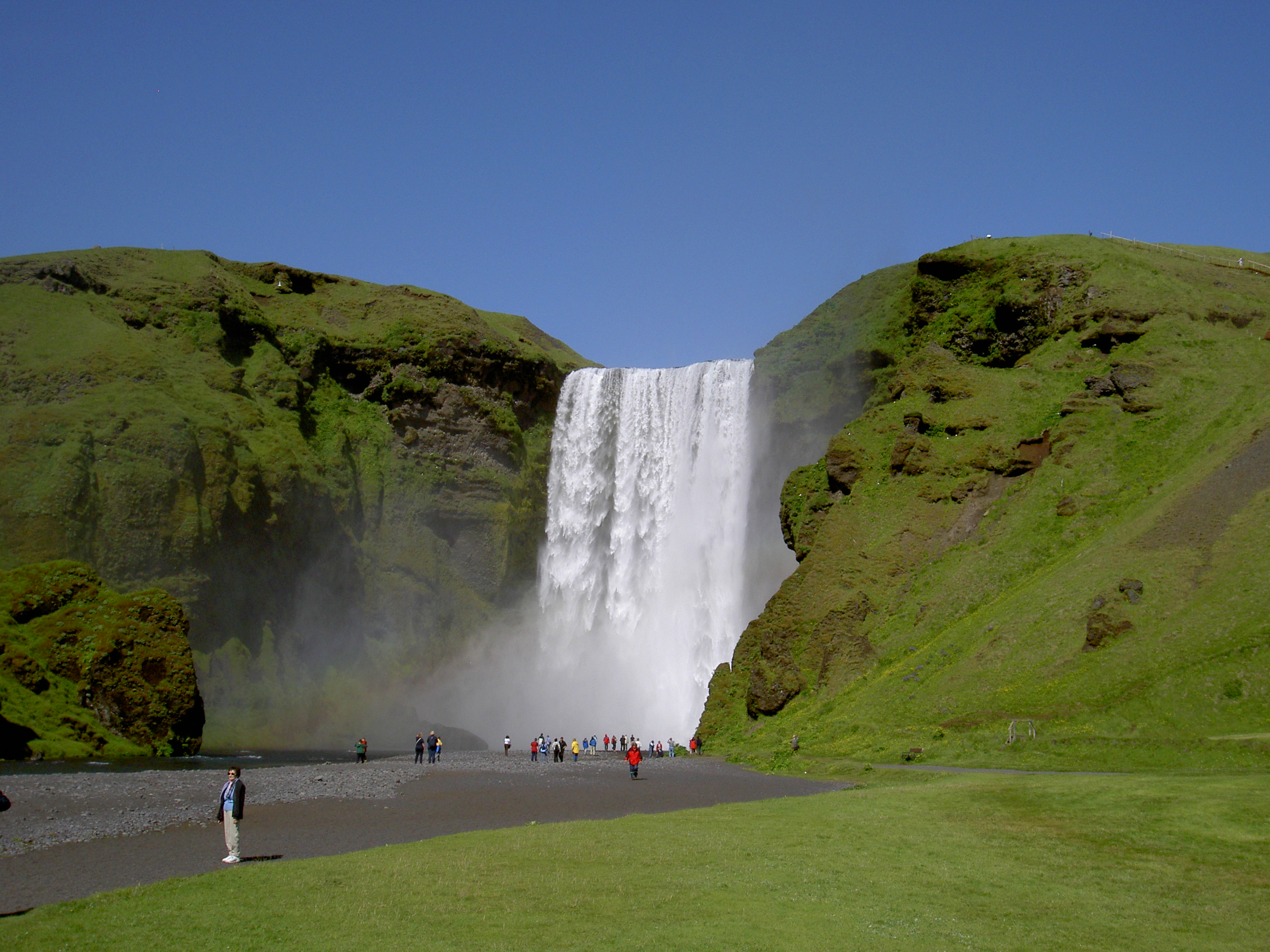
Skógafoss

- Öxarárfoss
- Seljalandsfoss
- Skógafoss
- Svartifoss

=== India ===
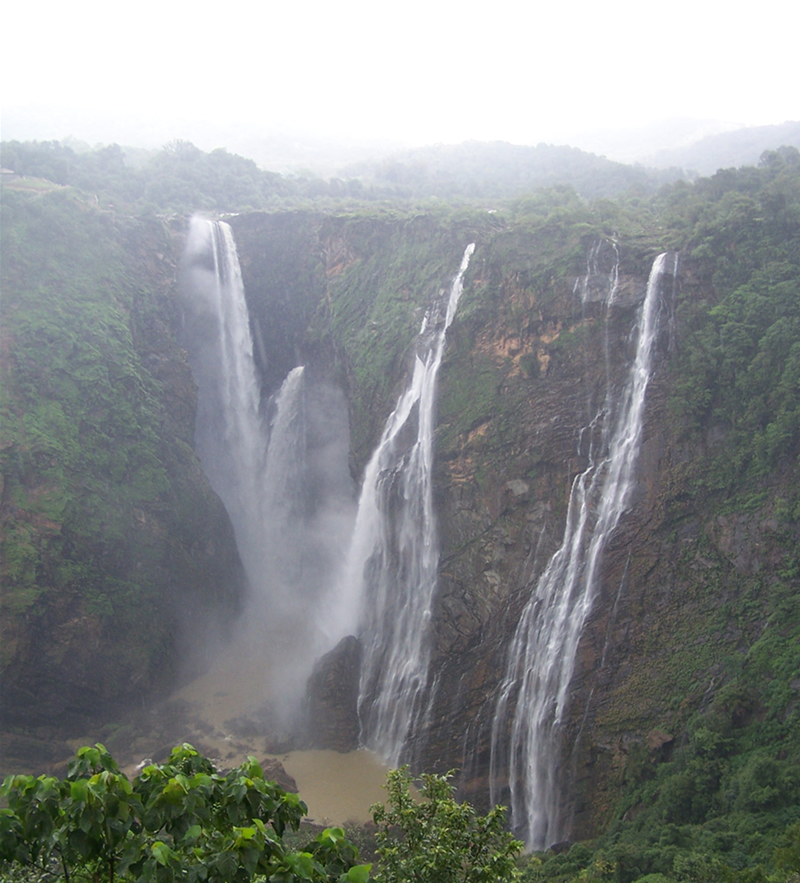
Jog Falls, India's second highest plunge waterfall, is made up of four distinct, segmented falls, and is fed by the Sharavathi River. The tallest plunges 830 ft (253 m) into a deep chasm in a continuous column of water.

- Nohkalikai Falls, Cherrapunjee- India's highest waterfalls.
- Jog Falls
- Shivanasamudra Falls

=== Indonesia ===
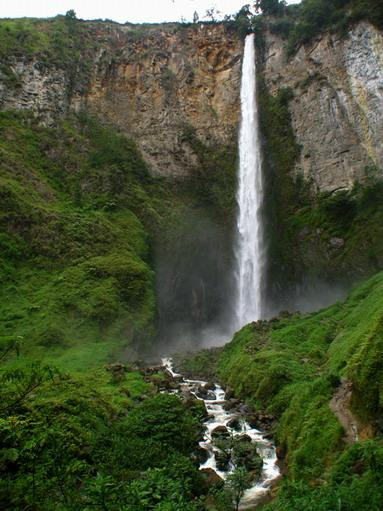
Sipisopiso

- Sipisopiso
- Coban Wolu Falls
- Coban Rondo Falls
- Kapas Biru Falls
- Penimbungan Falls
- Lembah Anai Falls
- Cimahi Falls
- Matayangu Falls
- Cimarinjung Falls
- Merdai Falls
- Bajing Falls
- Coban Baung Falls
- Coban Pelangi Falls

=== Japan ===
- Hannoki Falls
- Kegon Falls
- Nachi Falls
- Shōmyō Falls

=== Lesotho ===
- Maletsunyane Falls

=== Mexico ===
- Basaseachic Falls
- Piedra Volada

=== Mongolia ===
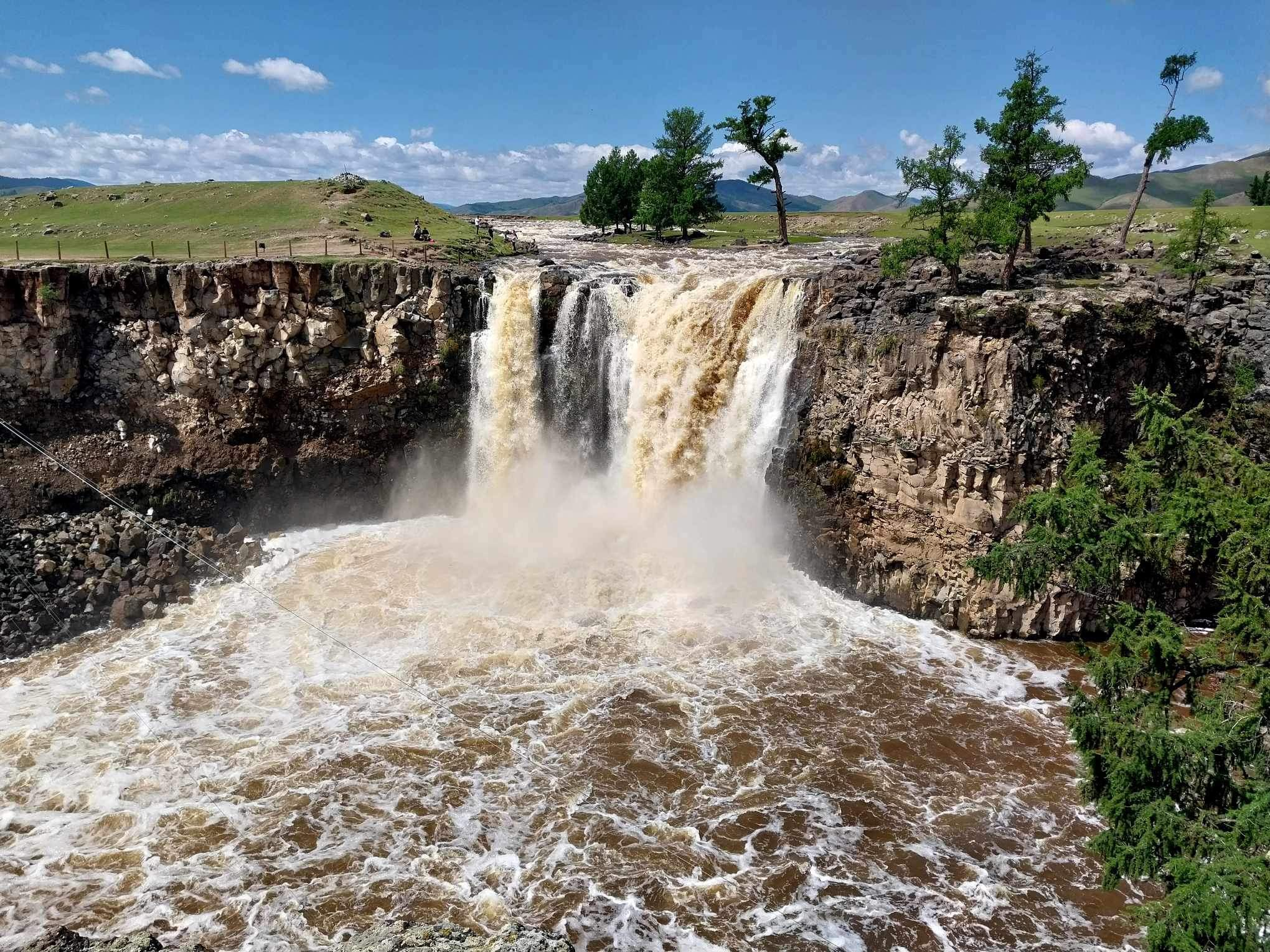
Ulaan tsutgalan in Mongolia During Summer 2023, the background is showing more geological structures formations and farther geological features

- Ulaan Tsutgalan Waterfall

=== Nepal ===
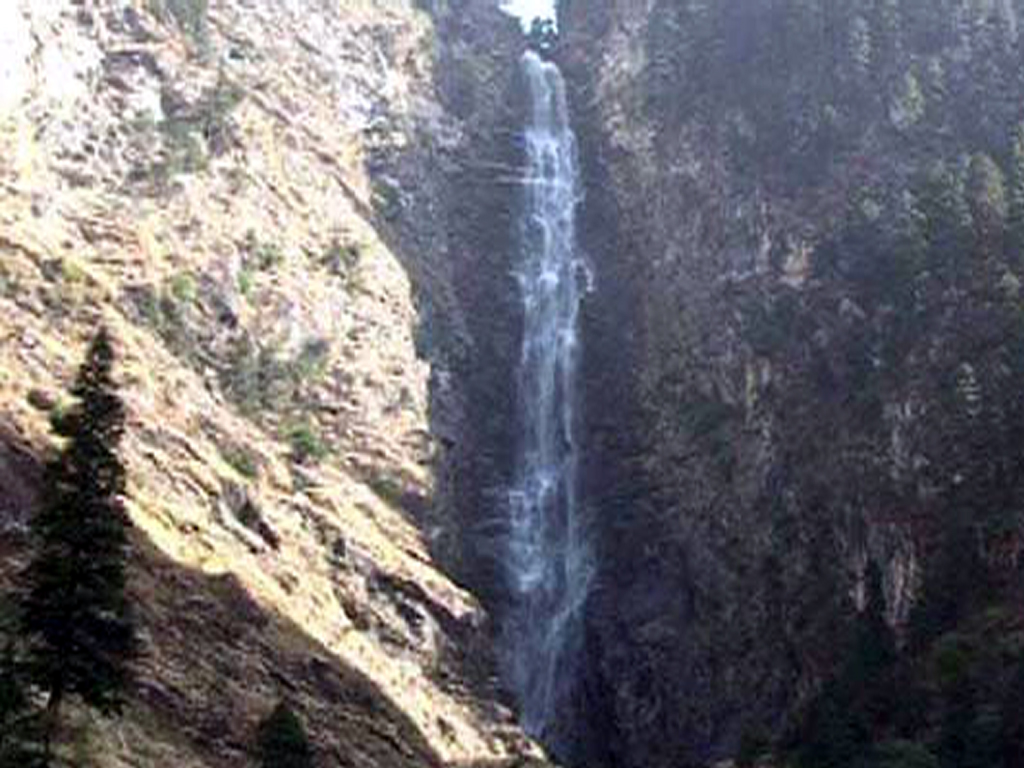
Pachal waterfall, a plunge Waterfall with height 482 m located at Kalikot District

- Pachal waterfall

=== New Zealand ===
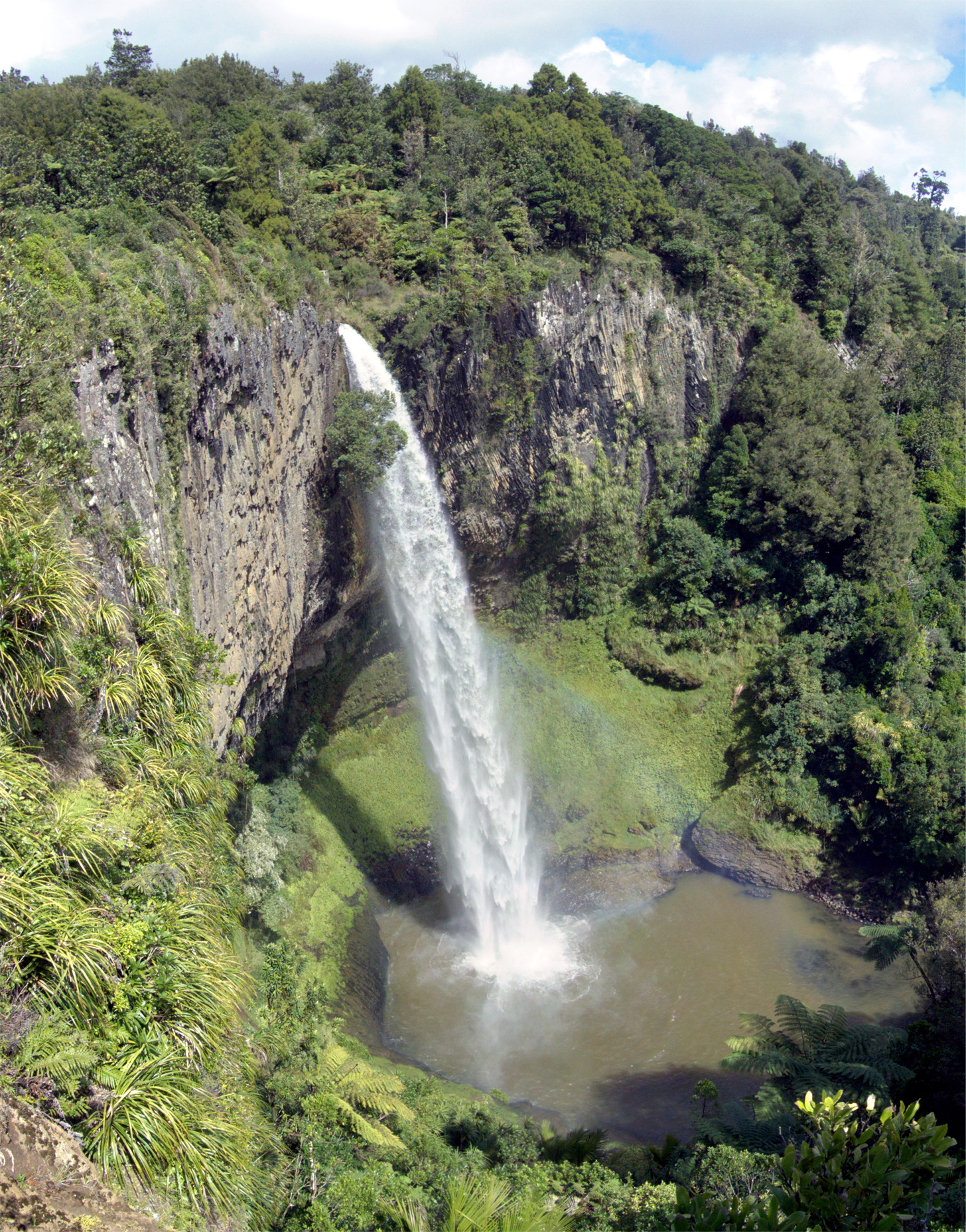
Bridal Veil Falls

- Bridal Veil Falls
- Rainbow Falls
- Tutea falls - cataract type waterfall
- Wairere Falls

=== Norway ===
- Kjelfossen
- Månafossen
- Mardalsfossen
- Ringedalsfossen or Skykkjedalsfossen
- Rjukan Falls
- Skrikjofossen
- Tyssestrengene
- Vettisfossen

Aerial video of Waterfall Bluff in South Africa.

=== South Africa ===
- Berlin Falls
- Mac-Mac Falls
- Tugela Falls
- Waterfall Bluff

=== Sri Lanka ===
- Laxapana Falls
- Diyaluma falls
- babarakanda falls

=== Sweden ===
- Njupeskär

=== Taiwan ===
- Jiao Lung Waterfall

=== Uganda ===
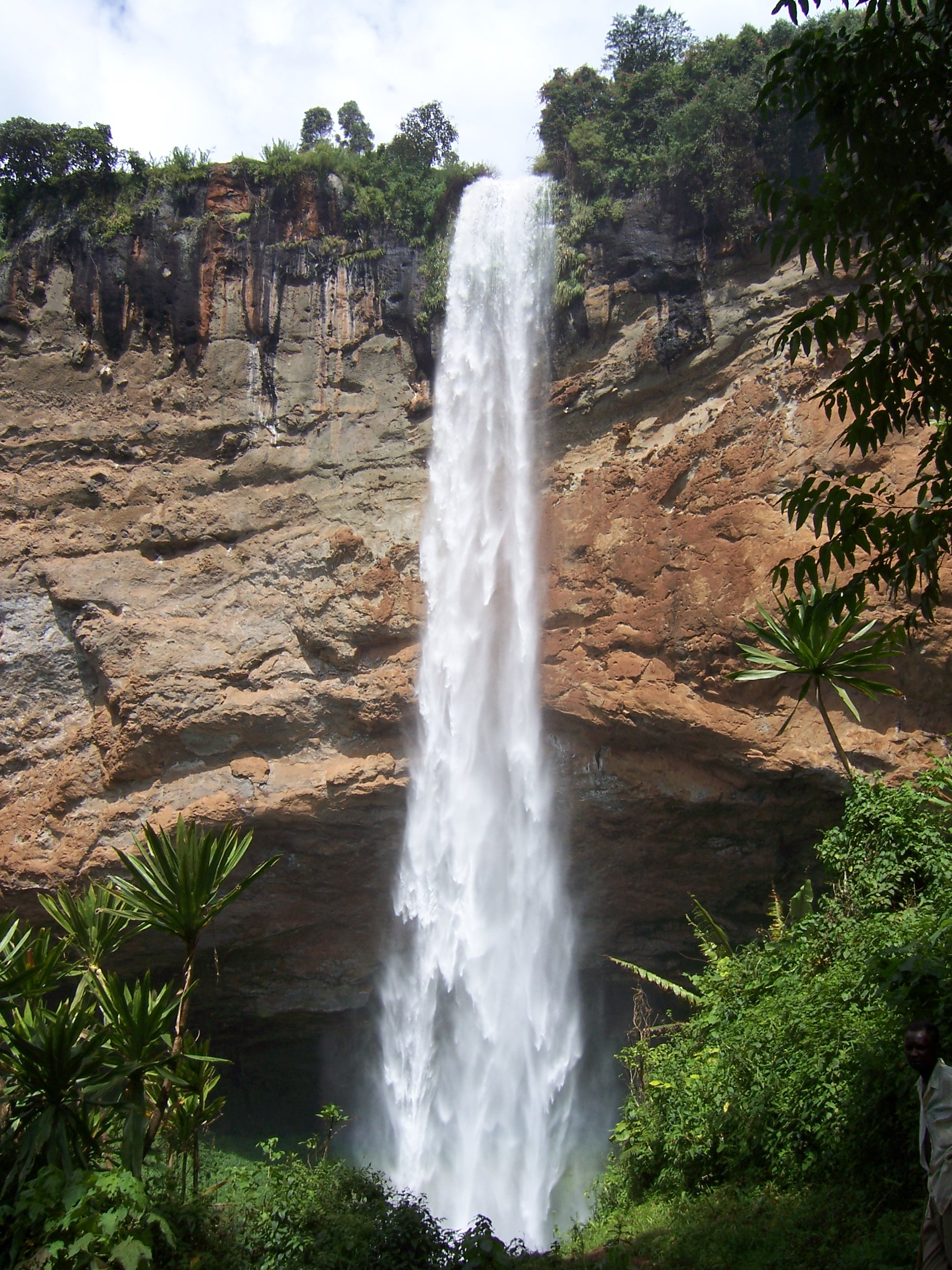
Sipi Falls

- Sipi Falls

=== United Kingdom ===
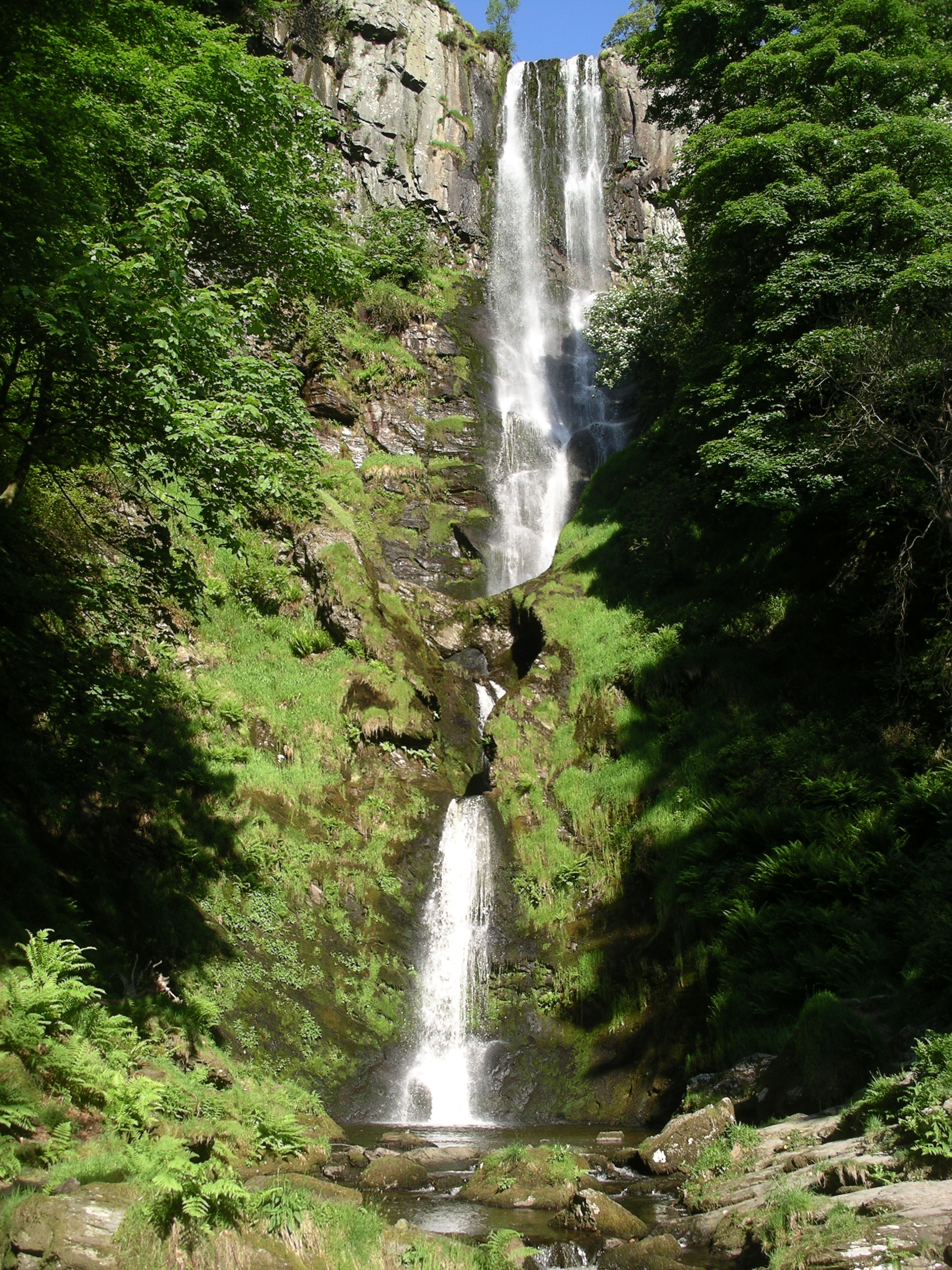
Pistyll Rhaeadr

- Devil's Appendix
- Ffrwd Fawr Waterfall
- Hardraw Force
- Melincourt Falls
- Pistyll Rhaeadr
- Sgwd Henrhyd

=== United States ===
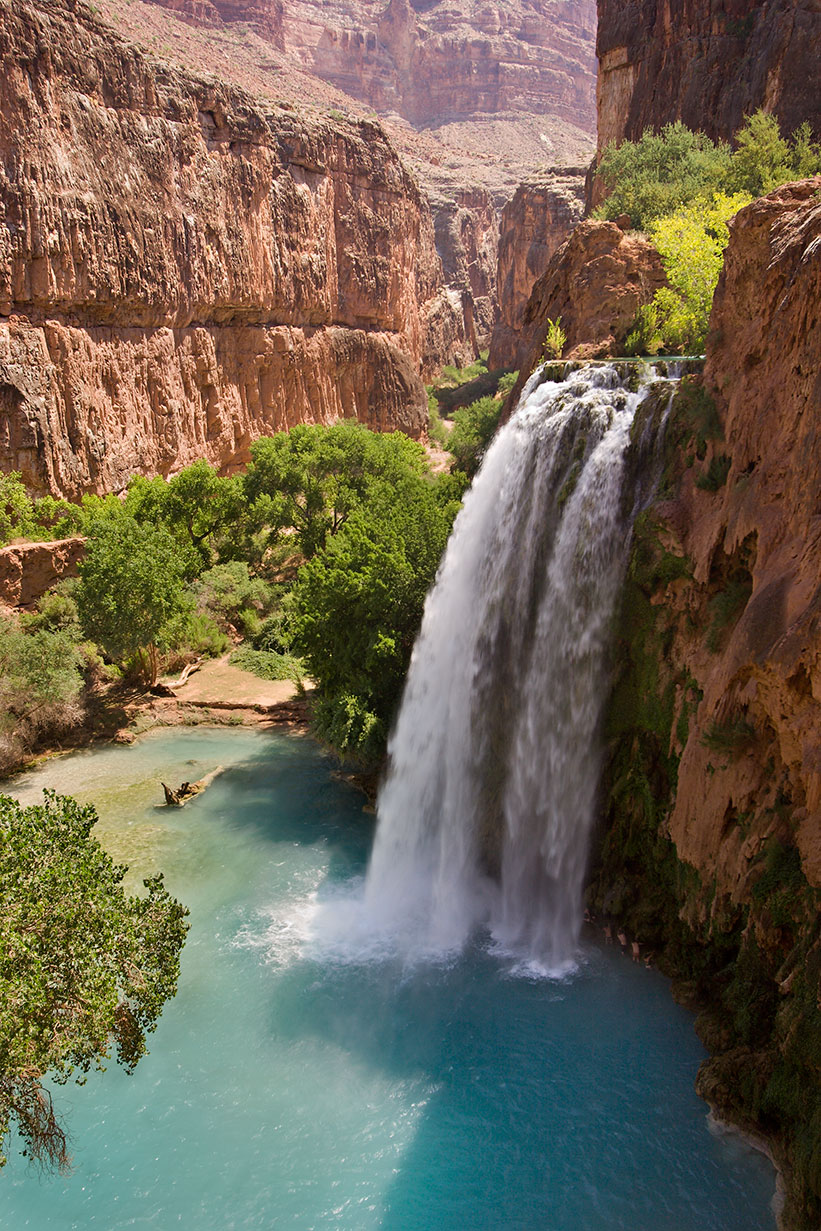
Havasu Falls

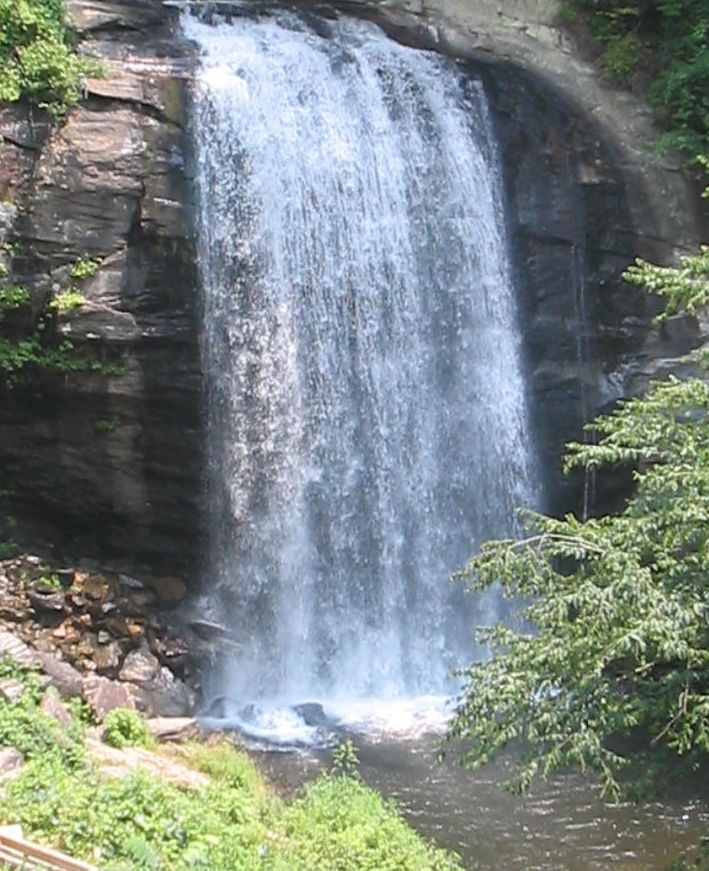
Looking Glass Falls

- Akaka Falls State Park
- Bridal Veil Falls (Macon County)
- Bridal Veil Falls (Telluride)
- Bridal Veil Falls (Washington)
- Bridalveil Fall (California)
- DeSoto Falls
- Douglas Falls
- Fall Creek Falls
- Feather Falls
- Havasu Falls
- Hemmed-In-Hollow Falls
- High Shoals Falls
- Iris Falls
- Lake Peigneur Drilling Disaster (Louisiana)
- Looking Glass Falls
- McWay Falls
- Minnehaha Falls
- Mooney Falls
- Moore Cove Falls
- Moose Falls
- Noccalula Falls Park
- Ozone Falls
- Palouse Falls
- Pearl Falls
- Rainbow Falls
- Raven Cliff Falls
- Ribbon Fall
- Slick Rock Falls
- Snoqualmie Falls
- Taughannock Falls
- Toccoa Falls
- Toketee Falls
- Tower Fall
- Vermillion Falls
- Vernal Fall
- Virgin Falls
- Wailua Falls
- Watson Falls
- Window Falls
- Yahoo Falls
- Yellowstone Falls

=== Venezuela ===
- Angel Falls
- Cuquenan Falls

=== Zambia ===
- Kalambo Falls

== Horsetail ==
Descending water maintains some contact with bedrock.

=== Australia ===
- Myrtle Forest Falls
- Seventh Falls
- Silver Falls
- Silverband Falls
- Steavenson Falls

=== Bosnia and Herzegovina ===
- Skakavac

=== Bulgaria ===
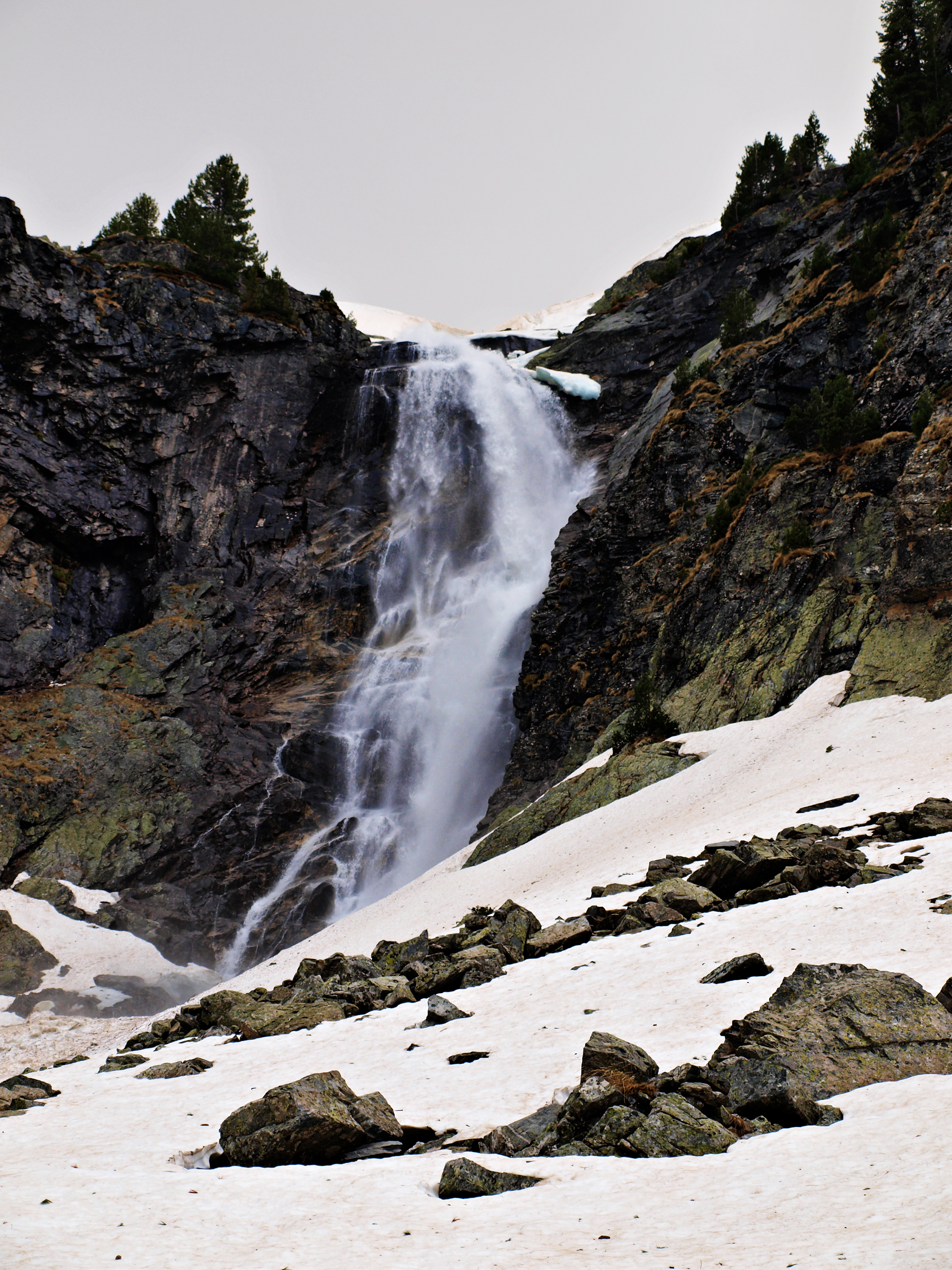
Skakavitsa Waterfall, Rila Mountain, Bulgaria in May

- Babsko Praskalo – 54 m (177 ft)
- Boyana Waterfall – 25 m (82 ft)
- Goritsa Waterfall – 39 m (128 ft)
- Karlovsko Praskalo – 30 m (98 ft)
- Skakavitsa Waterfall – 70 m (230 ft)
- Vratsa waterfalls
  - Skaklia (ephemeral) – 130 m (430 ft)
  - Borov Kamak – 63 m (207 ft)
- Raysko Praskalo – 124.5 m (408 ft), highest waterfall in the Balkans

=== Canada ===
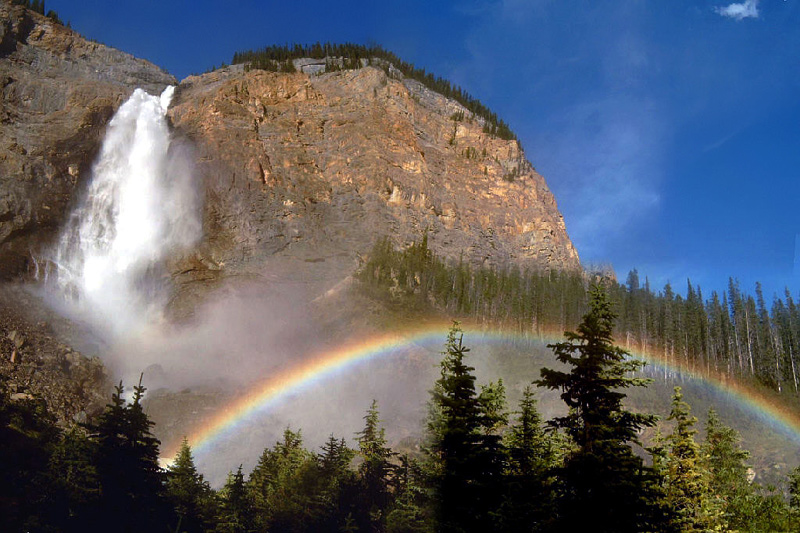
Takakkaw Falls

- Alfred Creek Falls
- Bergeron Falls
- Bridal Veil Falls
- Cascade Falls
- Cliff Lake Falls
- Crypt Falls
- Francis Falls
- Gold Creek Falls
- James Bruce Falls
- Kingcome Valley Falls
- Lineham Falls
- Michelle Falls
- Middle Cummins Falls
- Montmorency Falls
- Odegaard Falls
- Shannon Falls
- Snowshoe Creek Falls
- Takakkaw Falls
- Upper Geraldine Falls
- Uisge Ban Falls

=== Iceland ===
- Glymur
- Háifoss

=== India ===
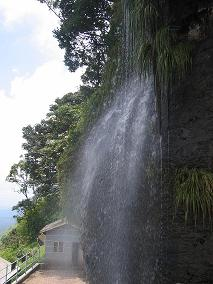
Manikyadhara Falls

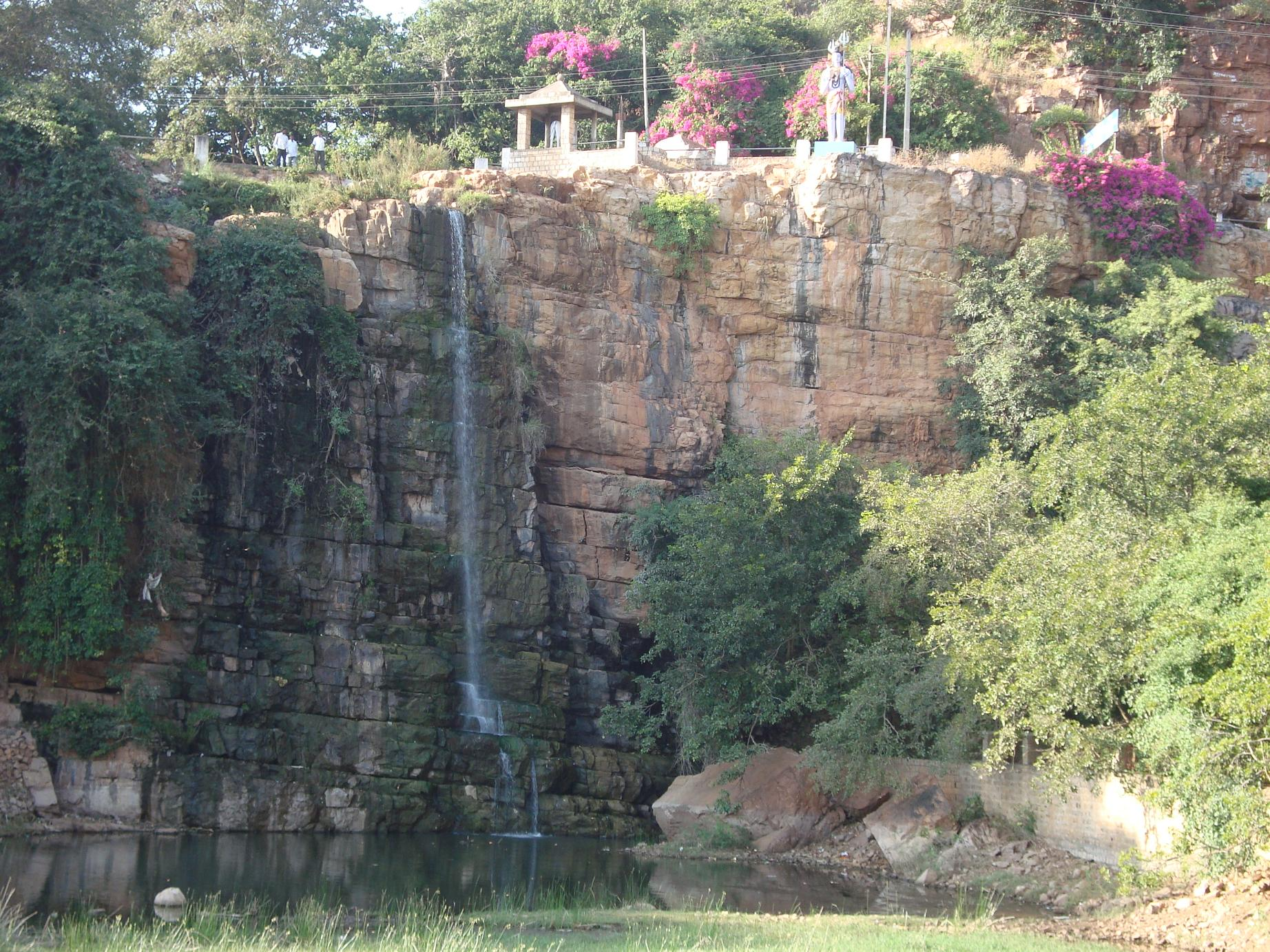
Sogal Falls

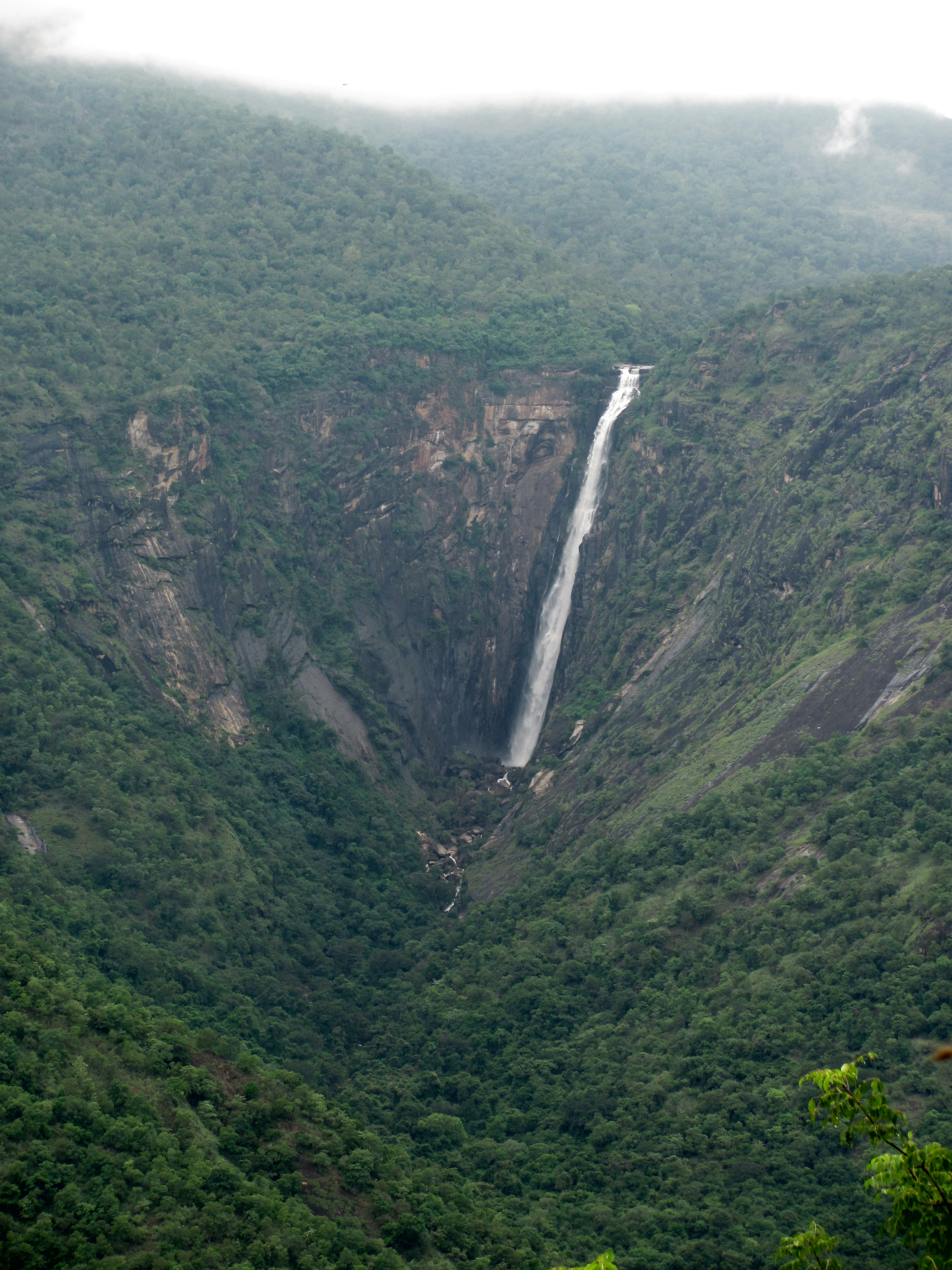
Thalaiyar Falls

- Jog Falls
- Athirappilly Falls
- Duduma Falls
- Kedumari Falls
- Khandadhar Falls
- Manikyadhara Falls
- Palaruvi Falls
- Rajat Prapat
- Sogal
- Sweet Falls
- Thalaiyar Falls

=== Ireland ===
- Powerscourt Waterfall

=== Lesotho ===
- Maletsunyane Falls

=== New Zealand ===
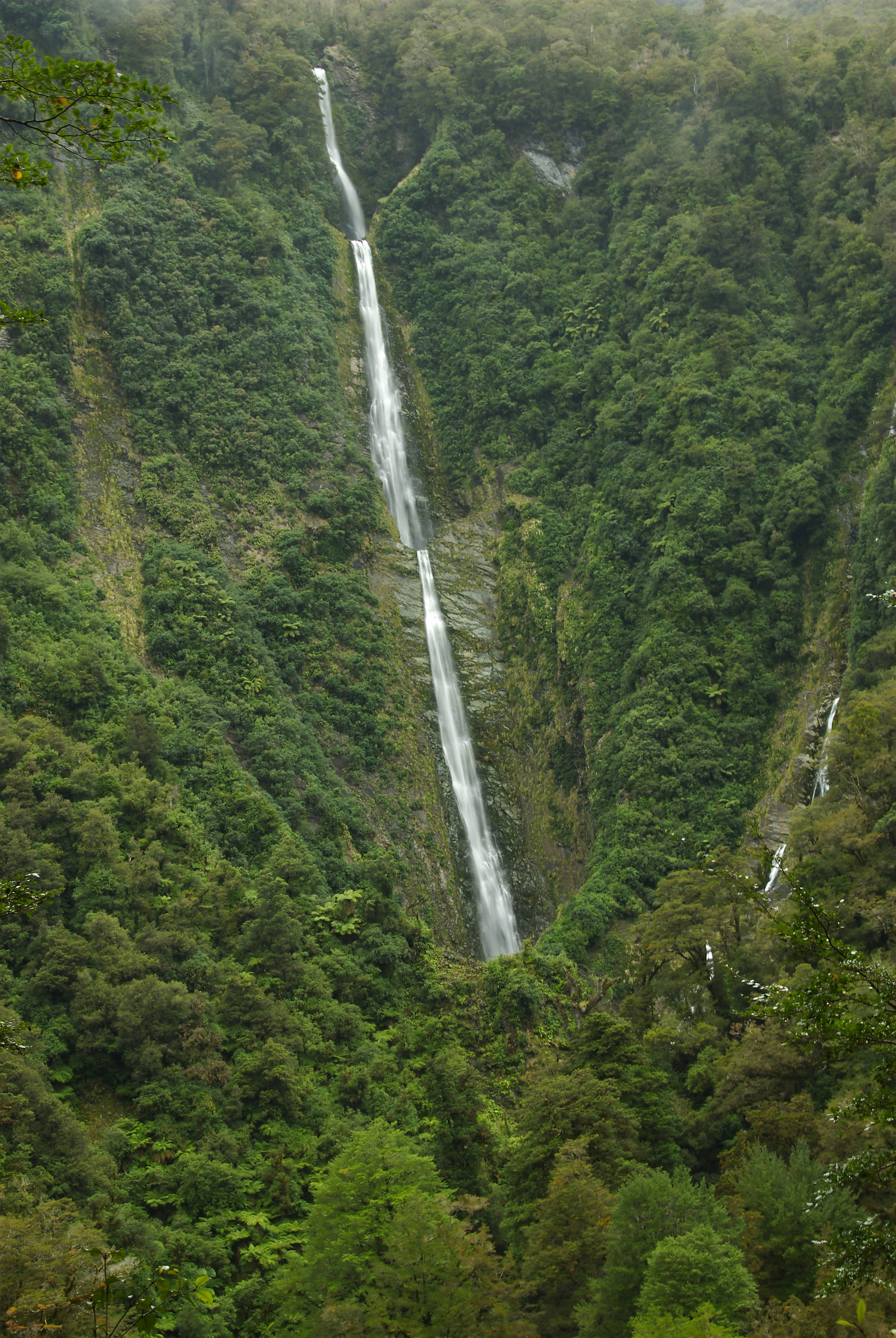
Humboldt Falls

- Humboldt Falls
- Lady Alice Falls
- Mount Damper Falls
- Wainui Falls

=== North Macedonia ===
- Smolare Waterfall

=== Norway ===
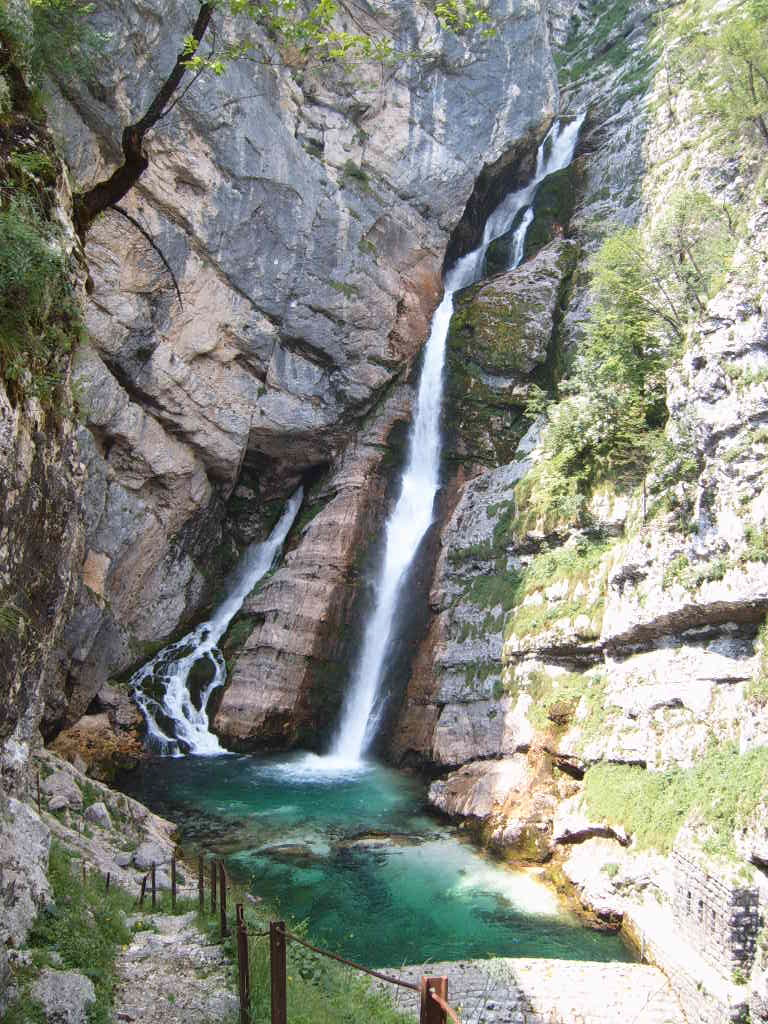
Sava Bohinjka

- Stalheimsfossen
- Vøringsfossen
- White Drin Waterfall

=== Philippines ===
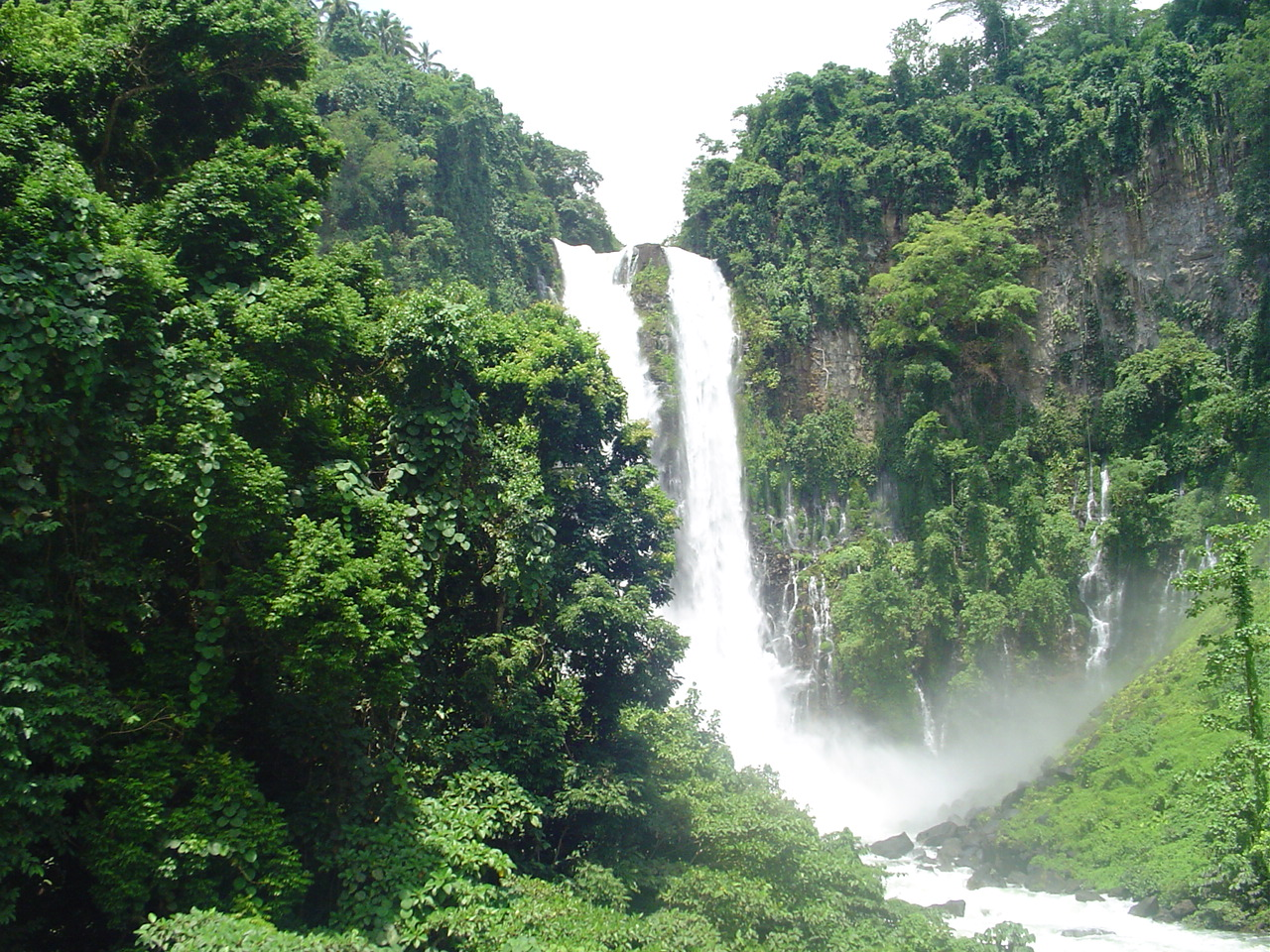
Maria Cristina Falls

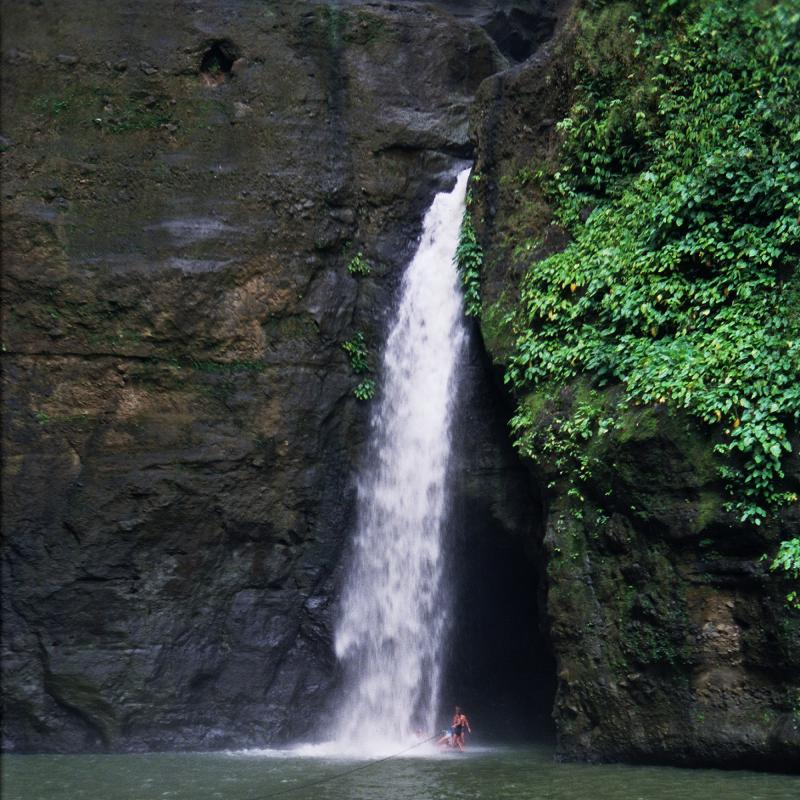
Pagsanjan Falls

- Maria Cristina Falls
- Pagsanjan Falls

=== Slovenia ===
- Sava Bohinjka

=== South Africa ===
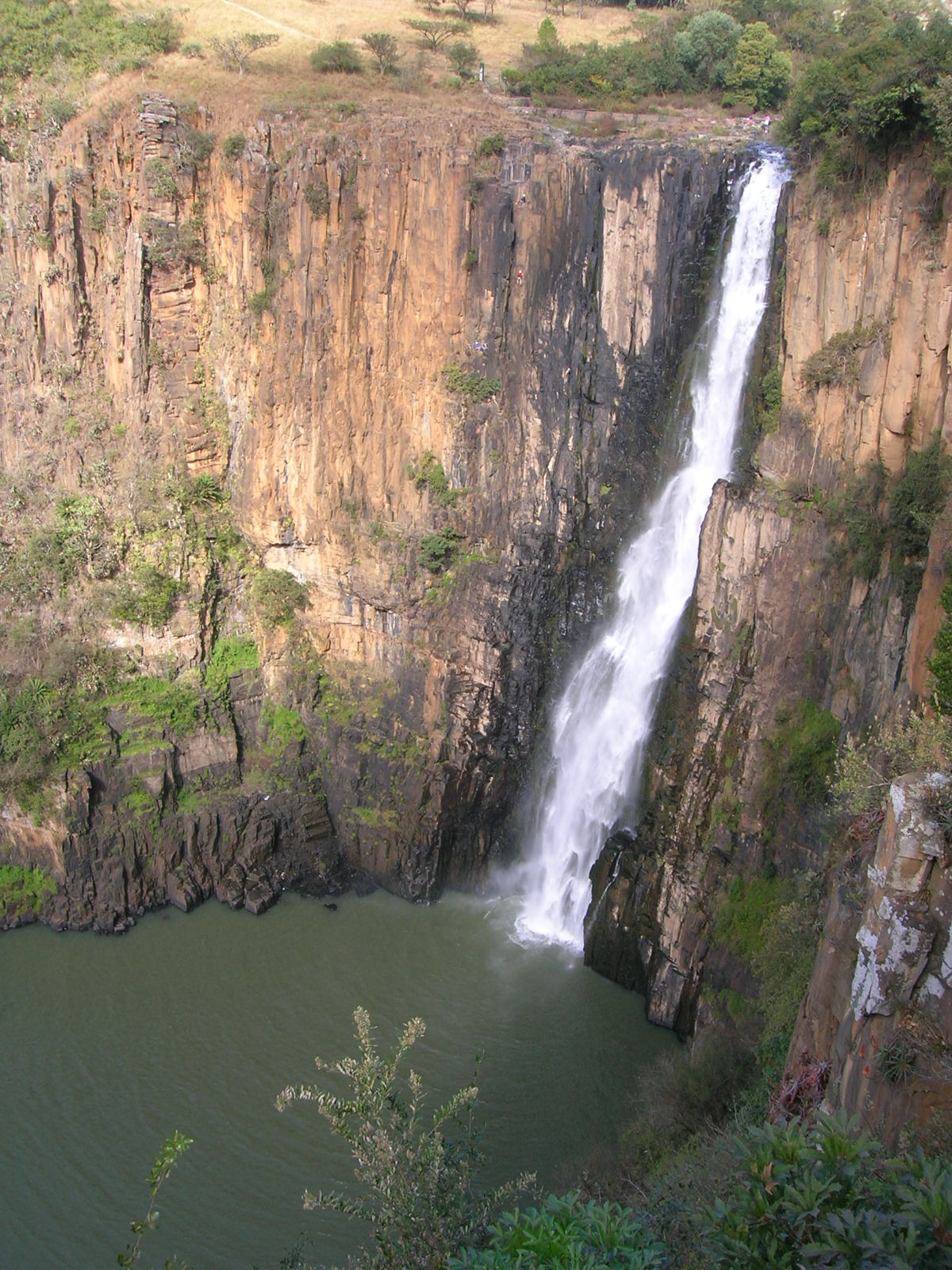
Howick Falls

- Howick Falls

=== Sri Lanka ===
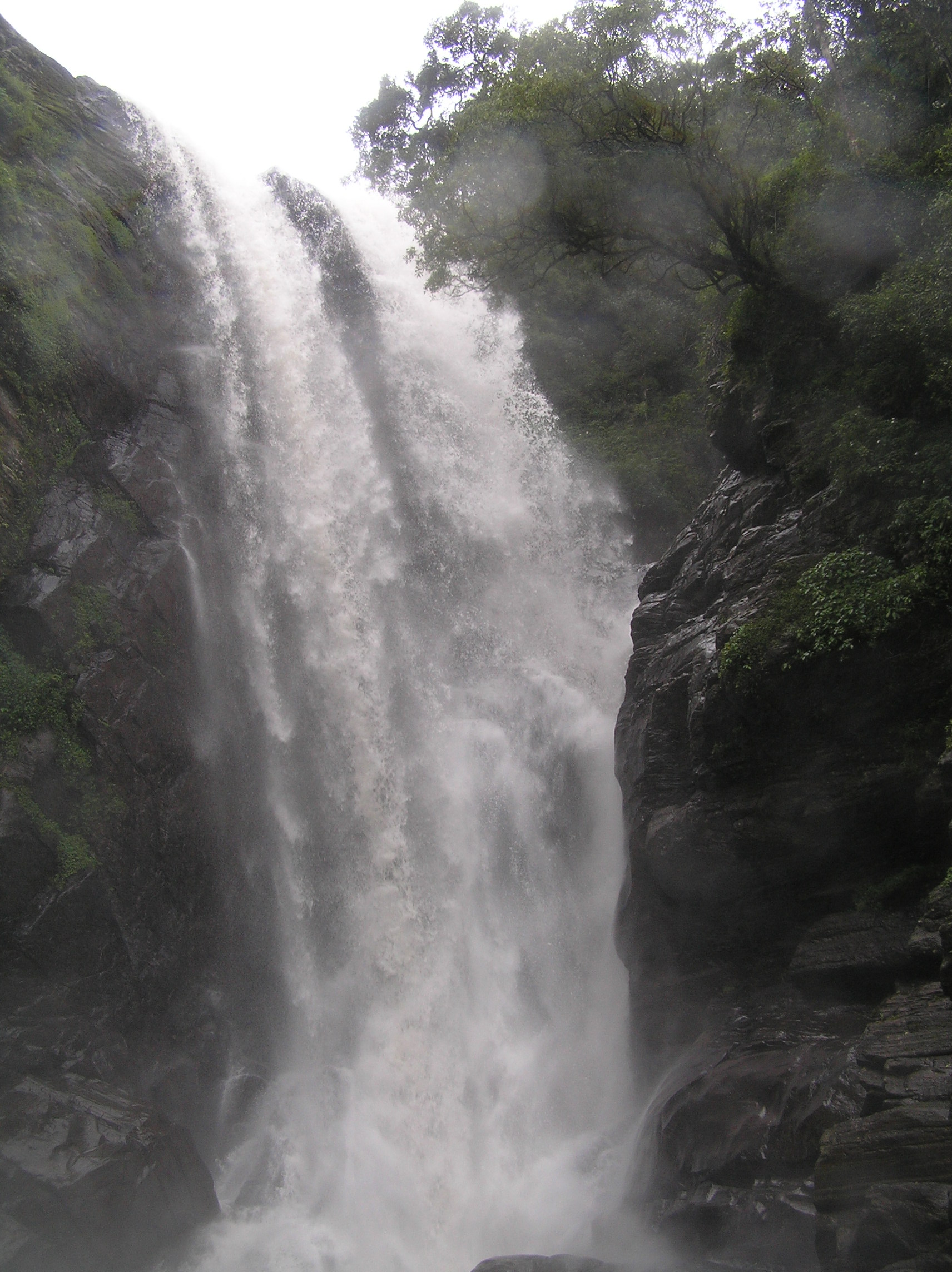
Elgin Falls

- Aberdeen
- Bambarakanda Falls
- Diyaluma Falls
- Elgin Falls
- Rawan Ella

=== Switzerland ===
- Reichenbach Falls
- Staubbach Fall

=== United Kingdom ===
- Grey Mare's Tail, Conwy
- River Lyd
- Spout of Garnock

=== United States ===
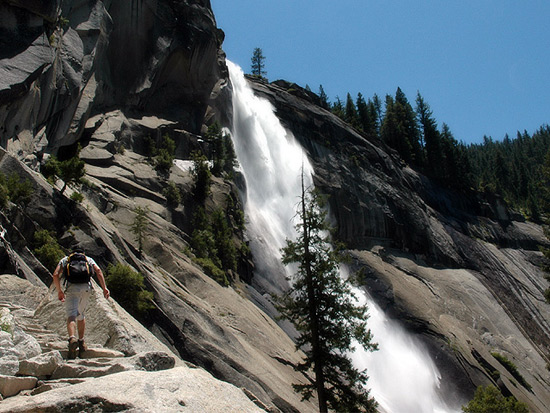
Nevada Fall

Hiʻilawe Waterfall

- Alamere Falls
- Anna Ruby Falls
- Cochrans Falls
- Courthouse Falls
- Darwin Falls
- DeSoto Falls
- Dick's Creek Falls
- Dukes Creek
- Fish Creek Falls
- Glassmine Falls
- Hickory Nut Falls
- Hiʻilawe Waterfall
- Holcomb Creek Falls
- Makahiku Falls
- Minnehaha Falls
- Nevada Fall
- Rainbow Falls
- Silver Strand Falls
- Waihilau Falls

== Cataract ==
A large, powerful waterfall.

=== Democratic Republic of the Congo ===
- Boyoma Falls

=== Mali ===
- Gouina Falls

=== Zambia/Zimbabwe ===
- Victoria Falls

=== India ===
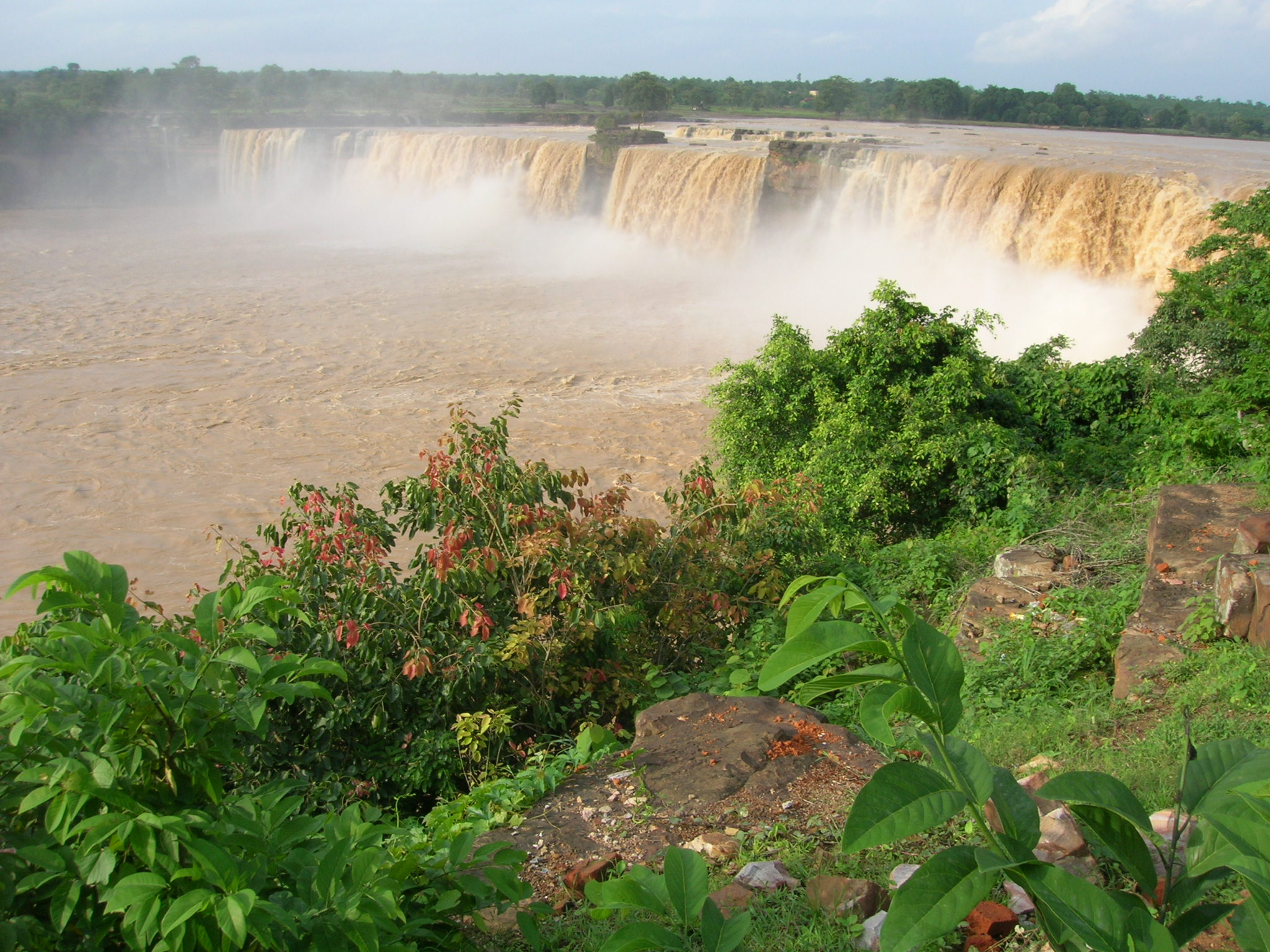
Chitrakot

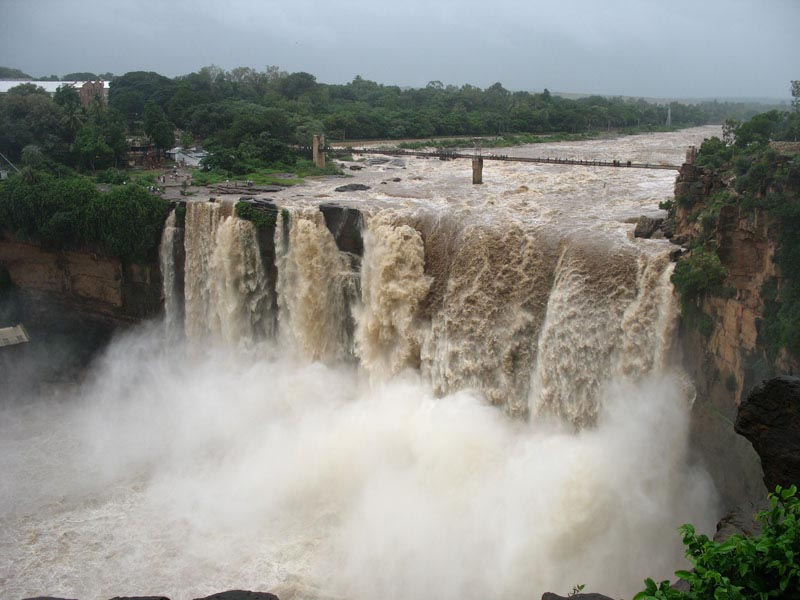
Gokak Falls

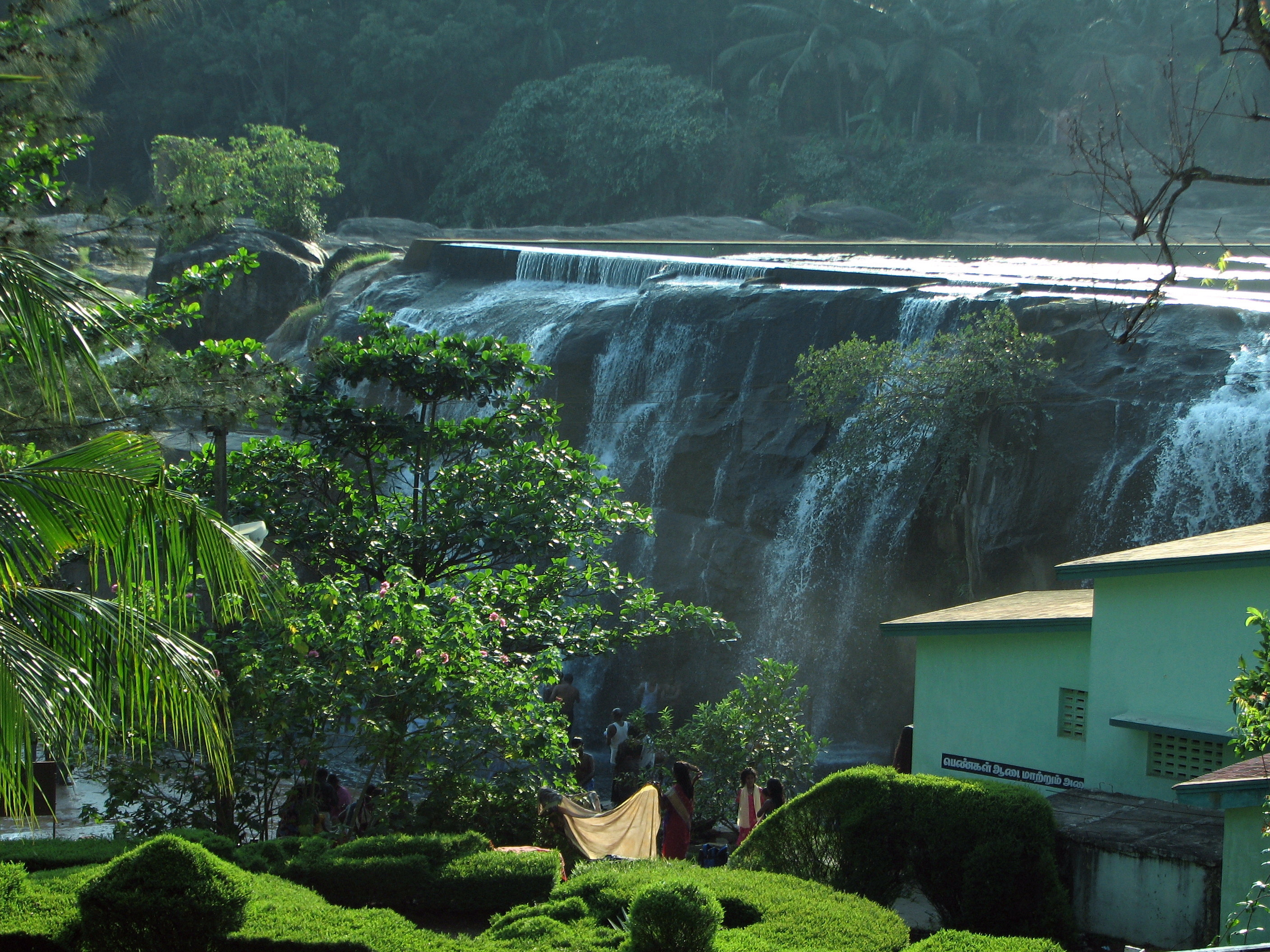
Tirparappu Waterfalls

- Chitrakoot Falls
- Gokak Falls
- Kakolat
- Thoovanam Waterfalls
- Tirparappu Waterfalls

=== Indonesia ===
- Banangar Falls
- Malela Falls
- Temam Falls
- Riam Merasap Falls

=== Argentina/Brazil ===
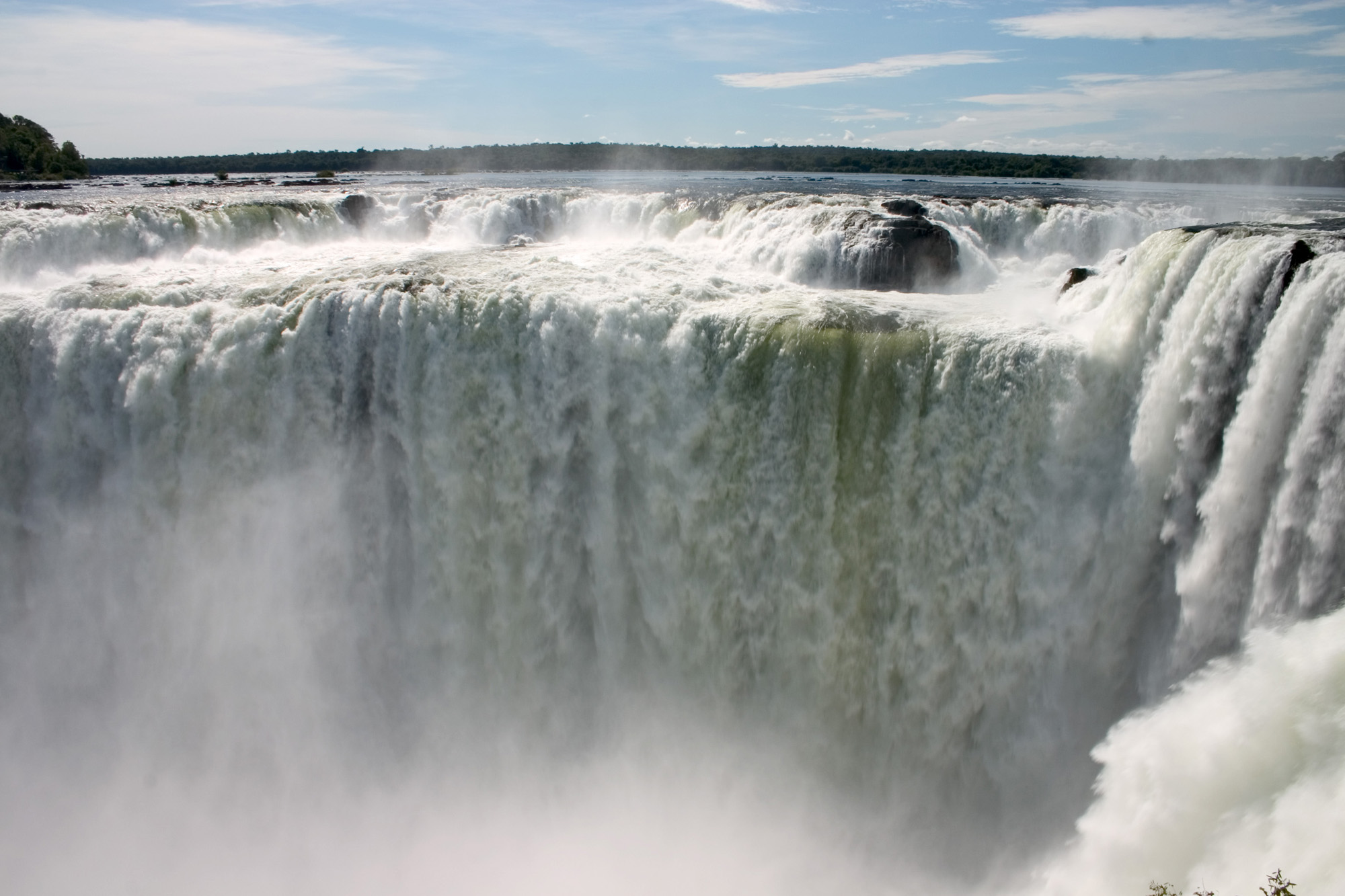
Devil's Throat, Iguaçu fall's largest cataract

- Iguaçu Falls

== Multi-step ==
A series of waterfalls one after another of roughly the same size each with its own sunken plunge pool.

=== Bulgaria ===
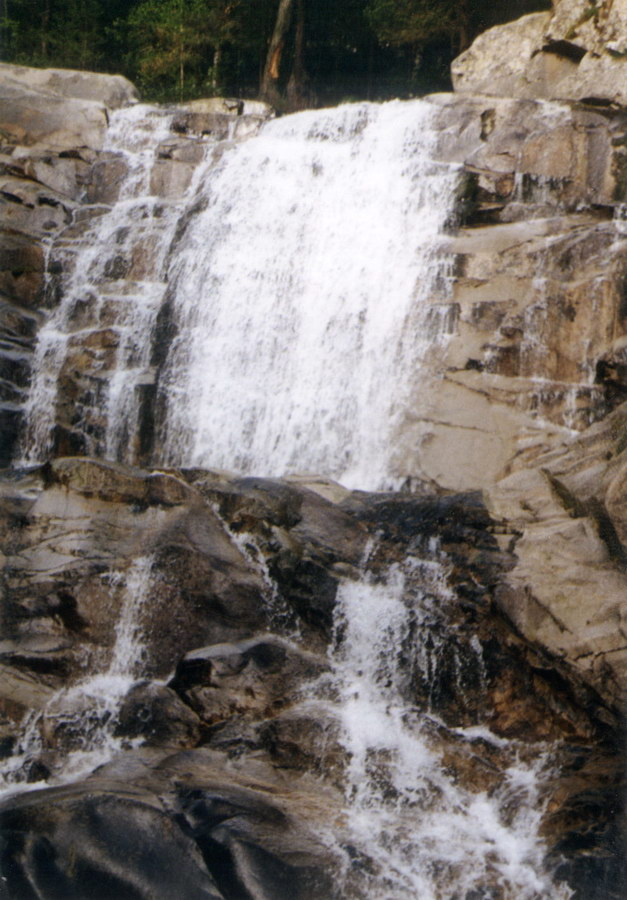
The Popinolashki waterfall

- Popinolashki waterfall – 12 m (39 ft)

=== Ghana ===
- Kintampo waterfalls

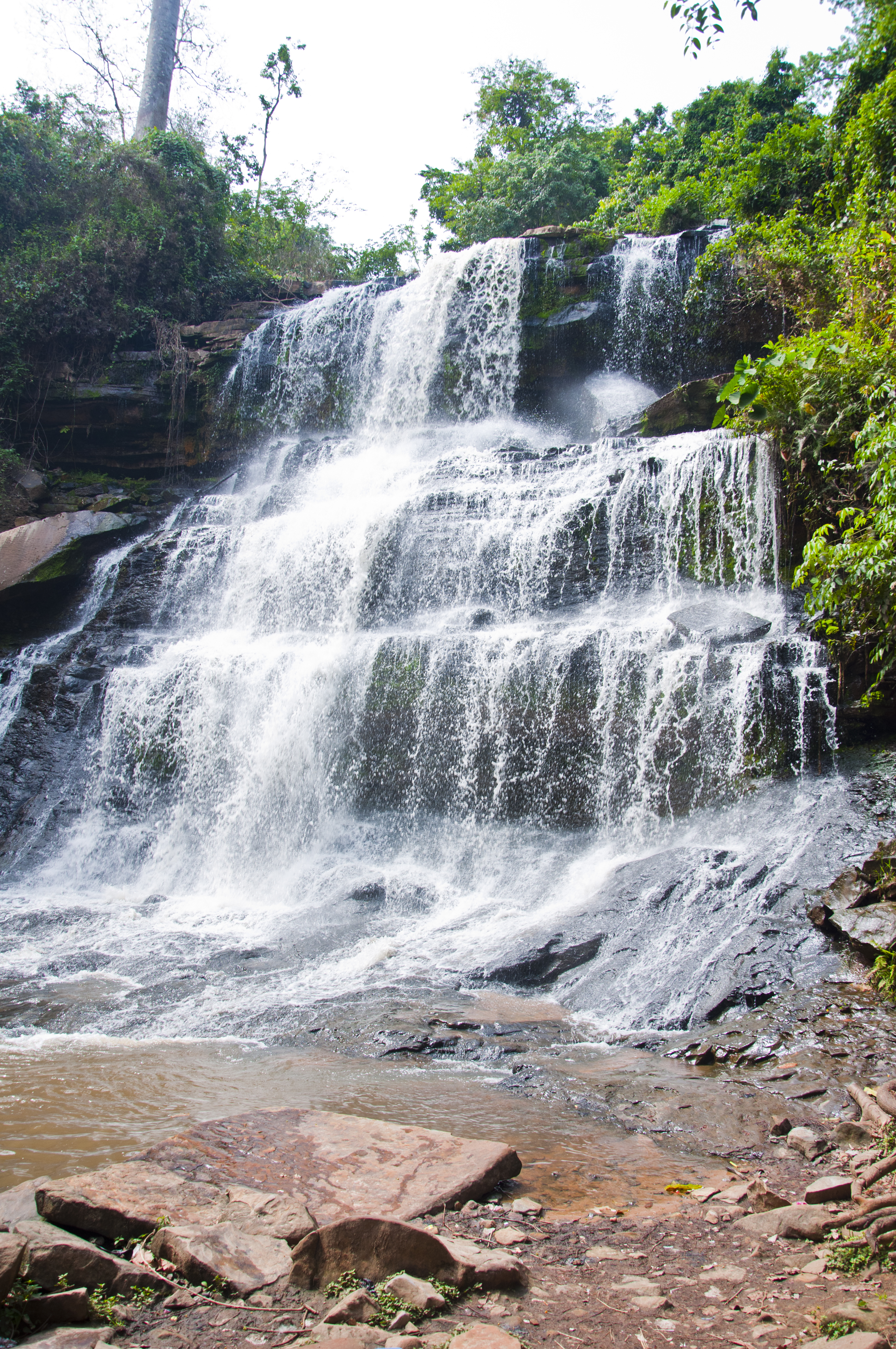
Kintampo waterfalls

=== Morocco ===
- Ouzoud Falls

=== Japan ===
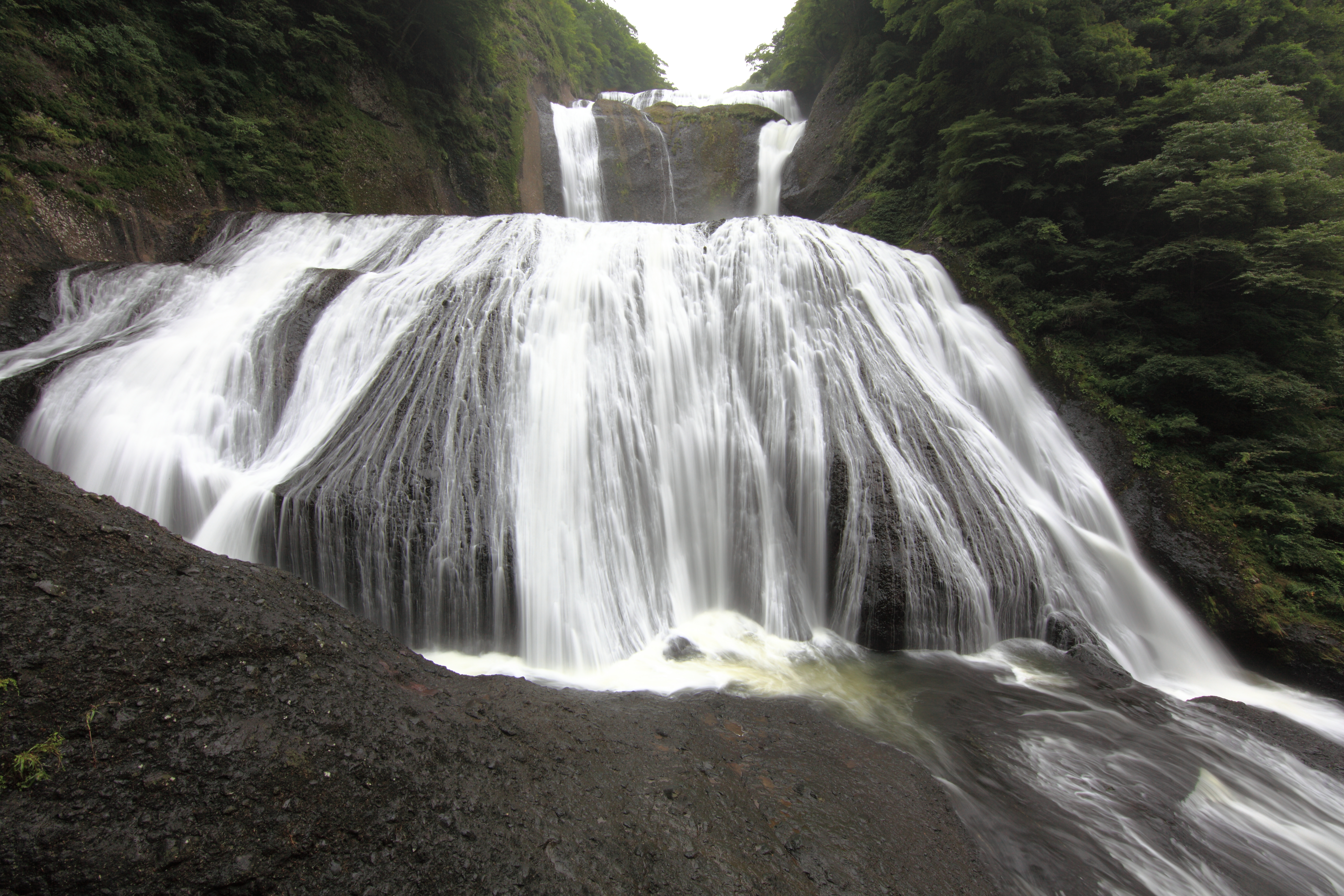
Fukuroda Falls

- Fukuroda Falls

=== Estonia ===
- Jägala Falls

=== Iceland ===
- Dettifoss
- Goðafoss
- Gullfoss
- Selfoss

== Block ==
Water descends from a relatively wide stream or river.

=== Ethiopia ===
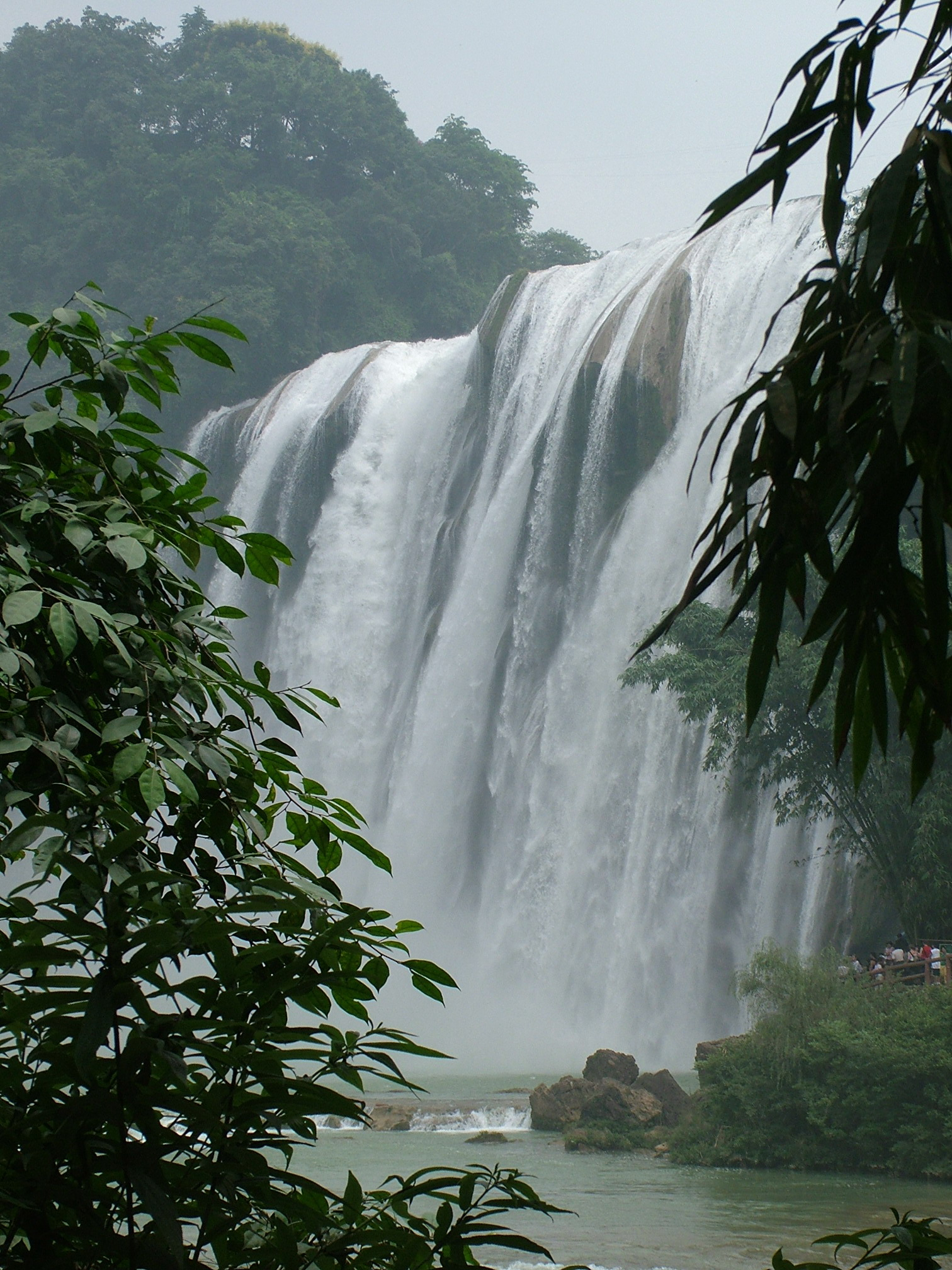
Huangguoshu Waterfall

- Blue Nile Falls

=== Cambodia ===
- Ka Choung

=== China ===
- Huangguoshu Waterfall

=== India ===
- Abbey Falls
- Aruvikkuzhi Waterfalls
- Athirappilly Falls
- Teerathgarh Falls

=== Korea ===
- Cheonjeyeon Waterfall

=== Zambia ===
- Ngonye Falls

=== Bosnia and Herzegovina ===
- Pliva Waterfall

=== Iceland ===
- Faxi
- Þjófafoss

=== Switzerland ===
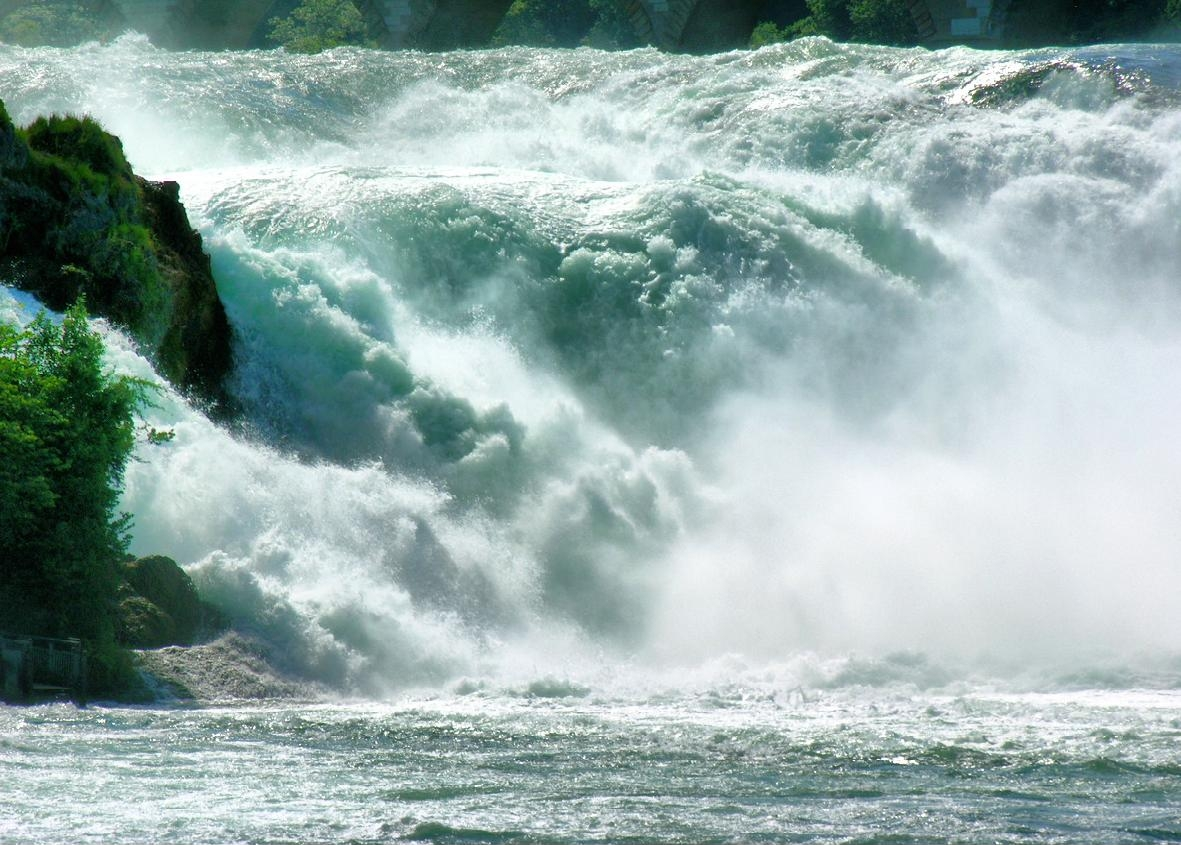
Rhine Falls

- Rhine Falls

=== Turkey ===
- Manavgat Waterfall

=== United Kingdom ===
- Aysgarth Falls
- Cotter Force
- Kisdon Force
- Low Force

=== Canada ===
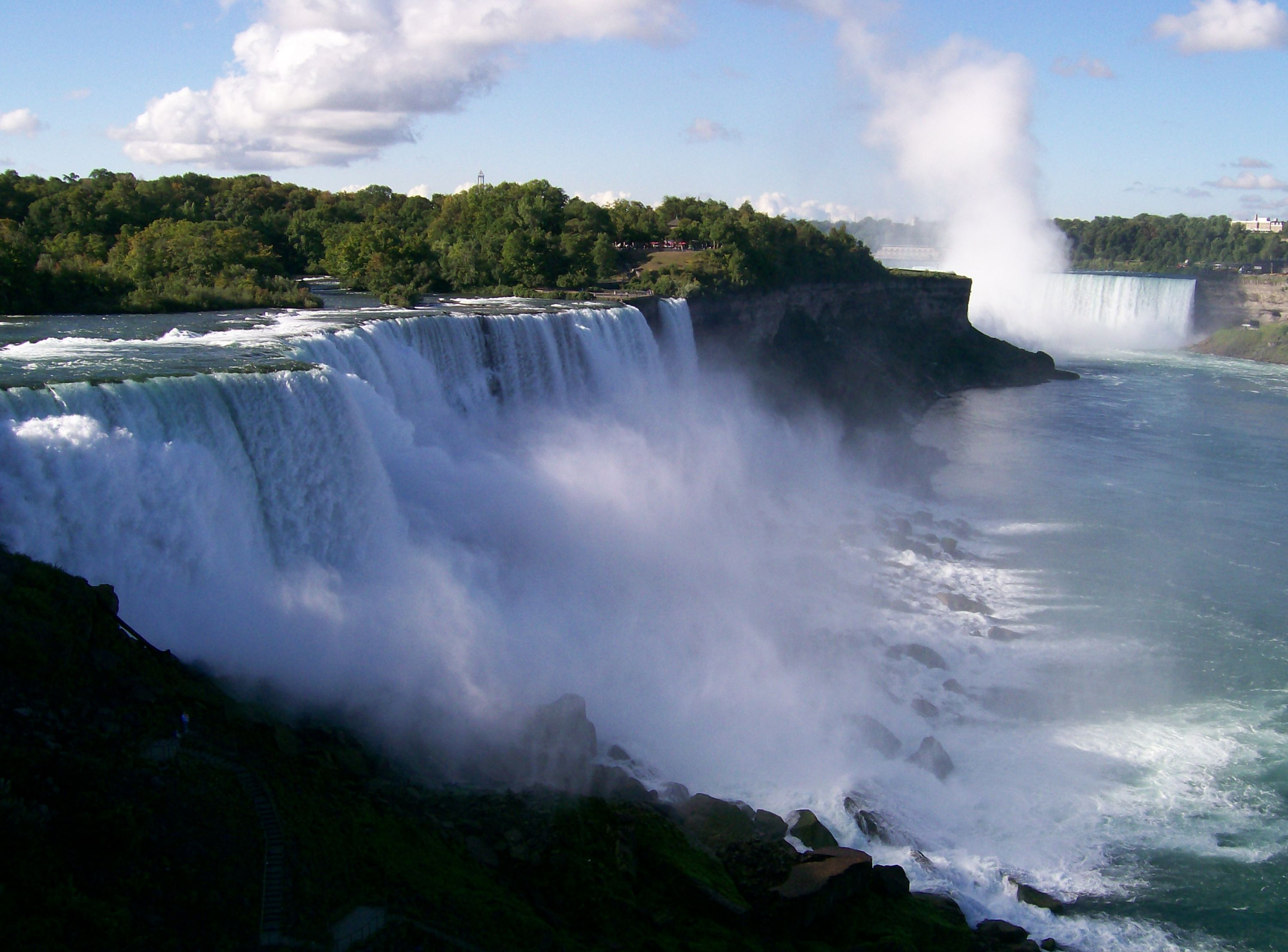
Niagara Falls

- Bow Falls
- Churchill Falls
- Fenelon Falls, Ontario
- Horseshoe Falls
- Niagara Falls
- Overlander Falls
- Wapta Falls

=== Mexico ===
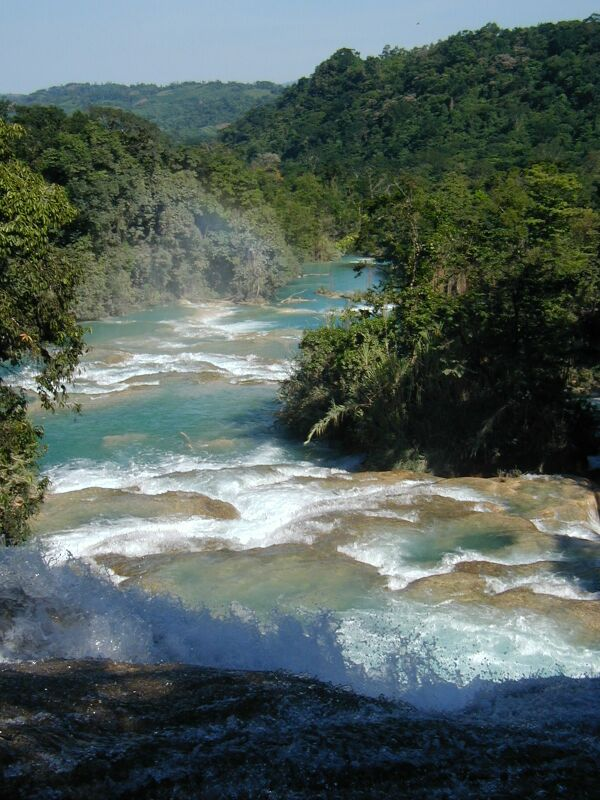
Agua Azul

- Agua Azul

=== United States ===
- American Falls
- Burgess Falls
- Cohoes Falls
- Cumberland Falls
- Hooker Falls
- Niagara Falls
- Rainbow Falls
- Saint Anthony Falls
- Shoshone Falls
- Upper Mesa Falls
- Willamette Falls

=== Australia ===
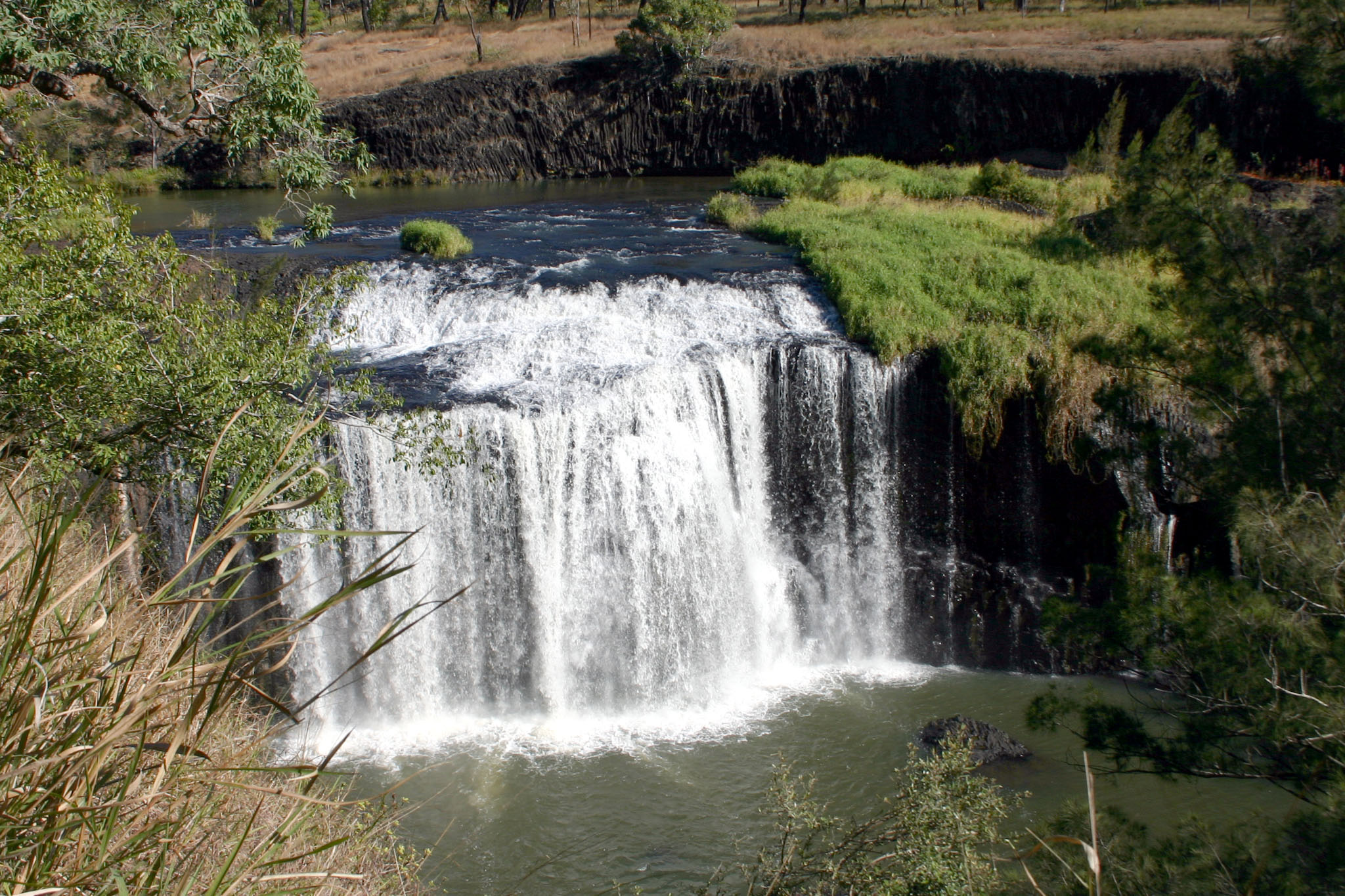
Millstream Falls

- Bridal Veil Falls
- Fernhook Falls
- Millstream Falls

=== Brazil ===
- Guaíra Falls

== Cascade ==
Water descends a series of rock steps.

=== Australia ===
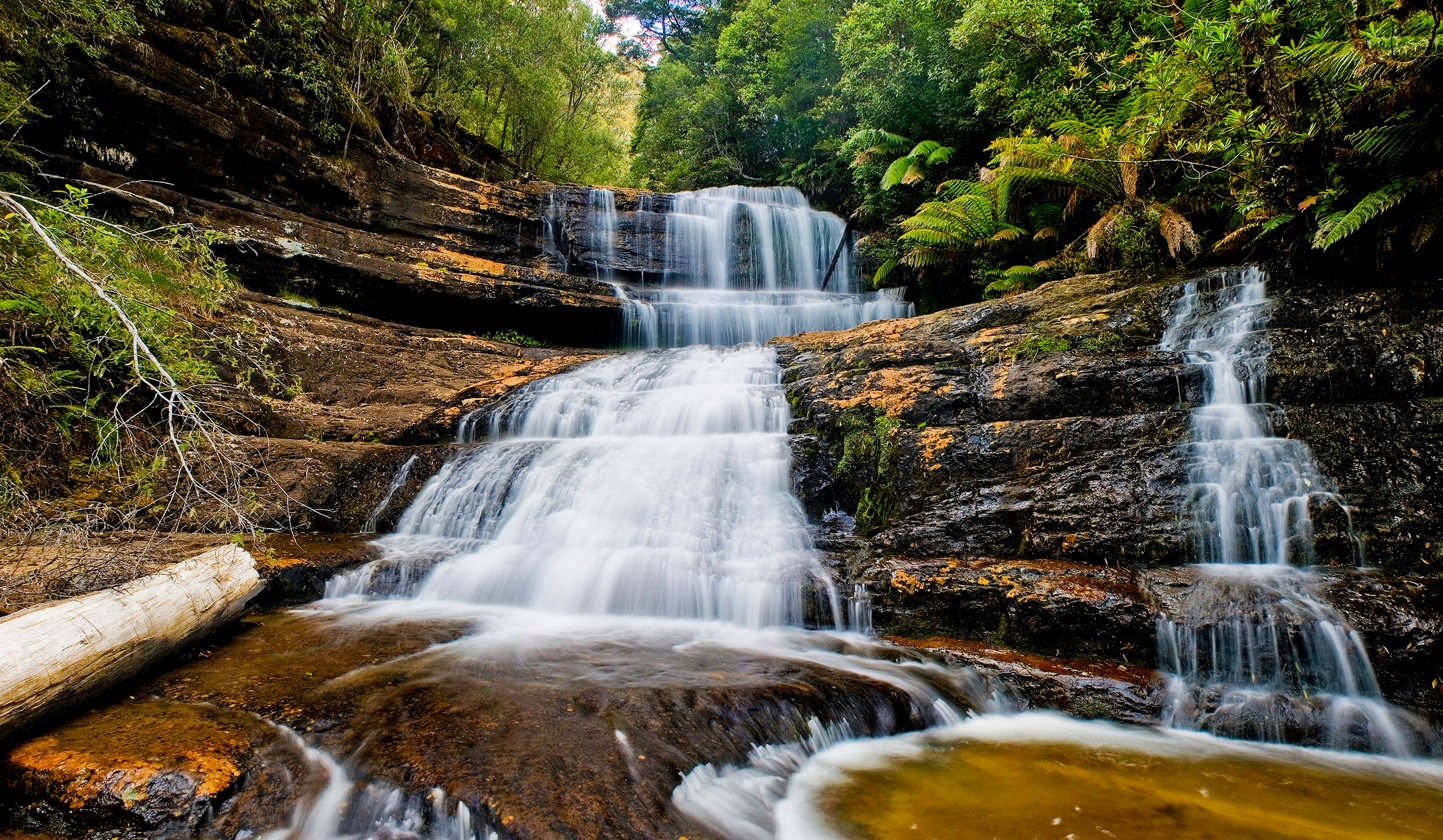
Lady Barron Falls

- Barron Falls
- Bloomfield Falls
- Dinner Falls
- Elabana Falls
- Goomoolahra Falls
- Josephine Falls
- Kearneys Falls
- Lobster Falls
- Stoney Creek Falls
- Surprise Creek Falls
- Tully Falls
- Lady Barron Falls
- Liffey Cascade
- Liffey Falls
- Balaka Falls
- Serpentine Falls

=== Austria ===
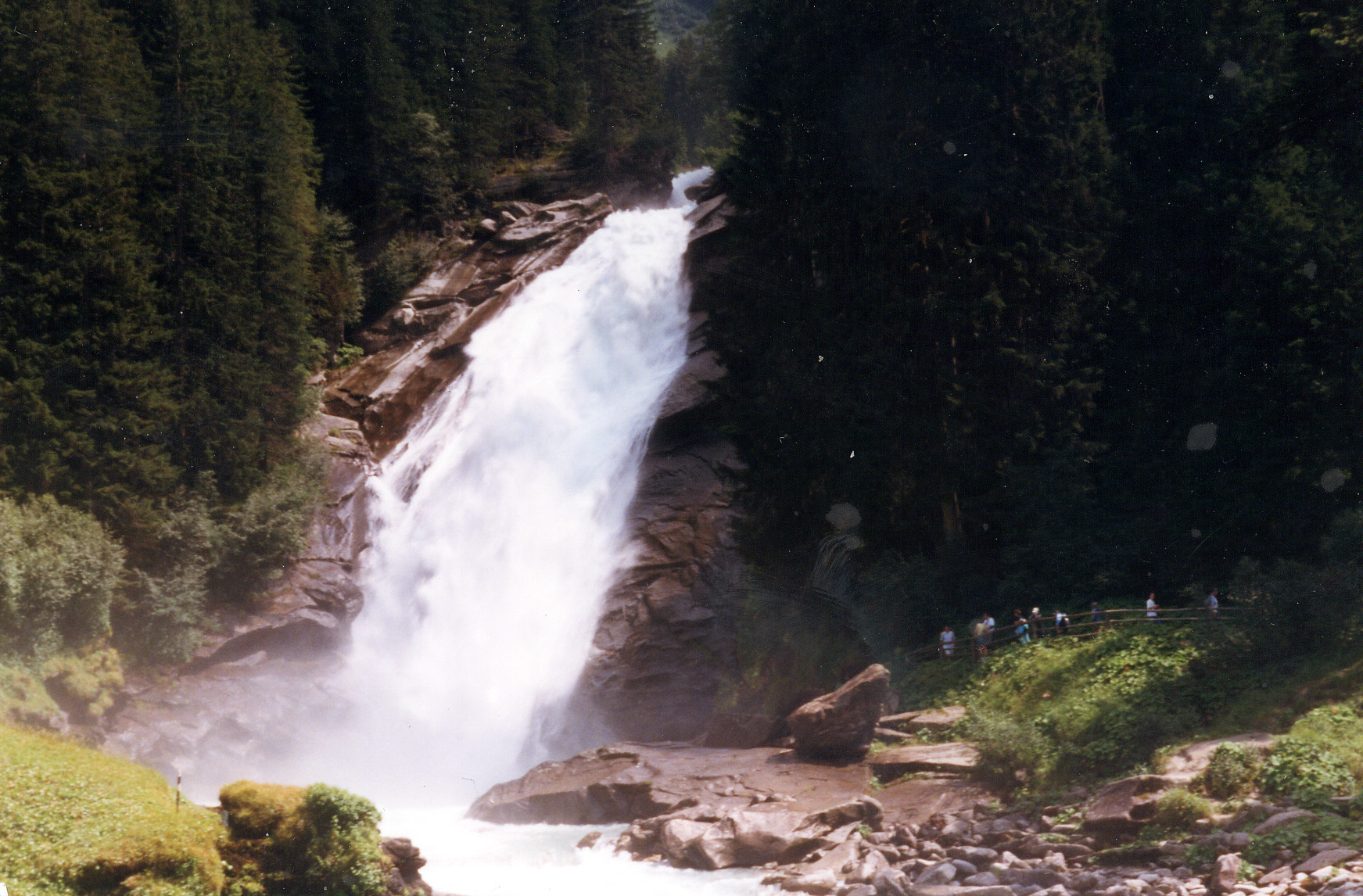
Krimmler Wasserfälle

- Krimmler Wasserfälle

=== Canada ===
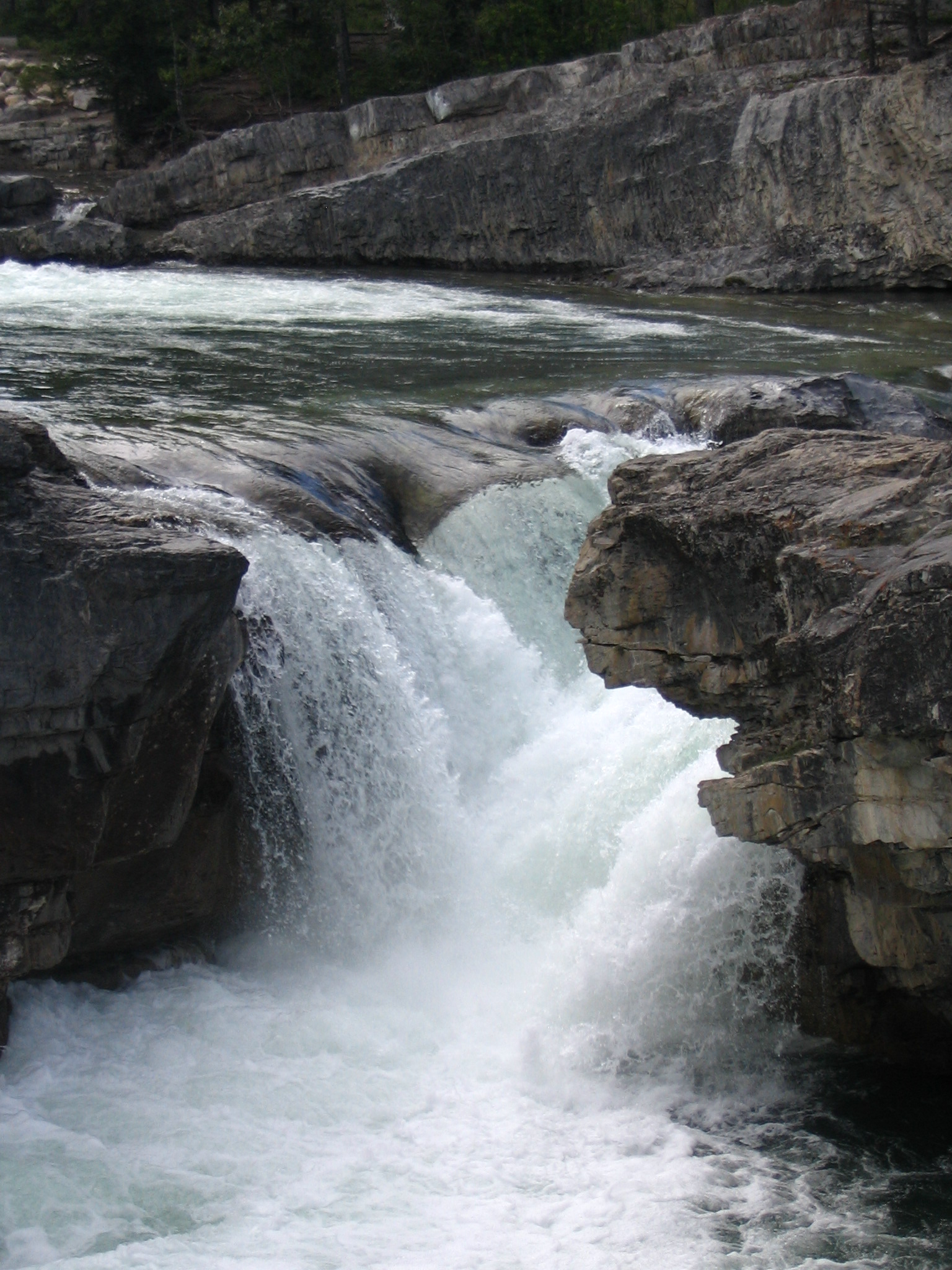
Elbow Falls

- Albion Falls
- Alfred Creek Falls
- Angel's Staircase Falls
- Athabasca Falls
- Elbow Falls
- Helen Falls
- Inglis Falls
- Kitchener Creek Falls
- Margaret Falls
- Nymph Falls
- Pokiok Falls
- Sandy Pond Falls
- Sicamous Creek Falls
- Thunder Falls

=== China ===
- Hukou Waterfall

=== Finland ===
- Hepoköngäs

=== Germany ===
- Triberg Waterfalls

=== Iceland ===
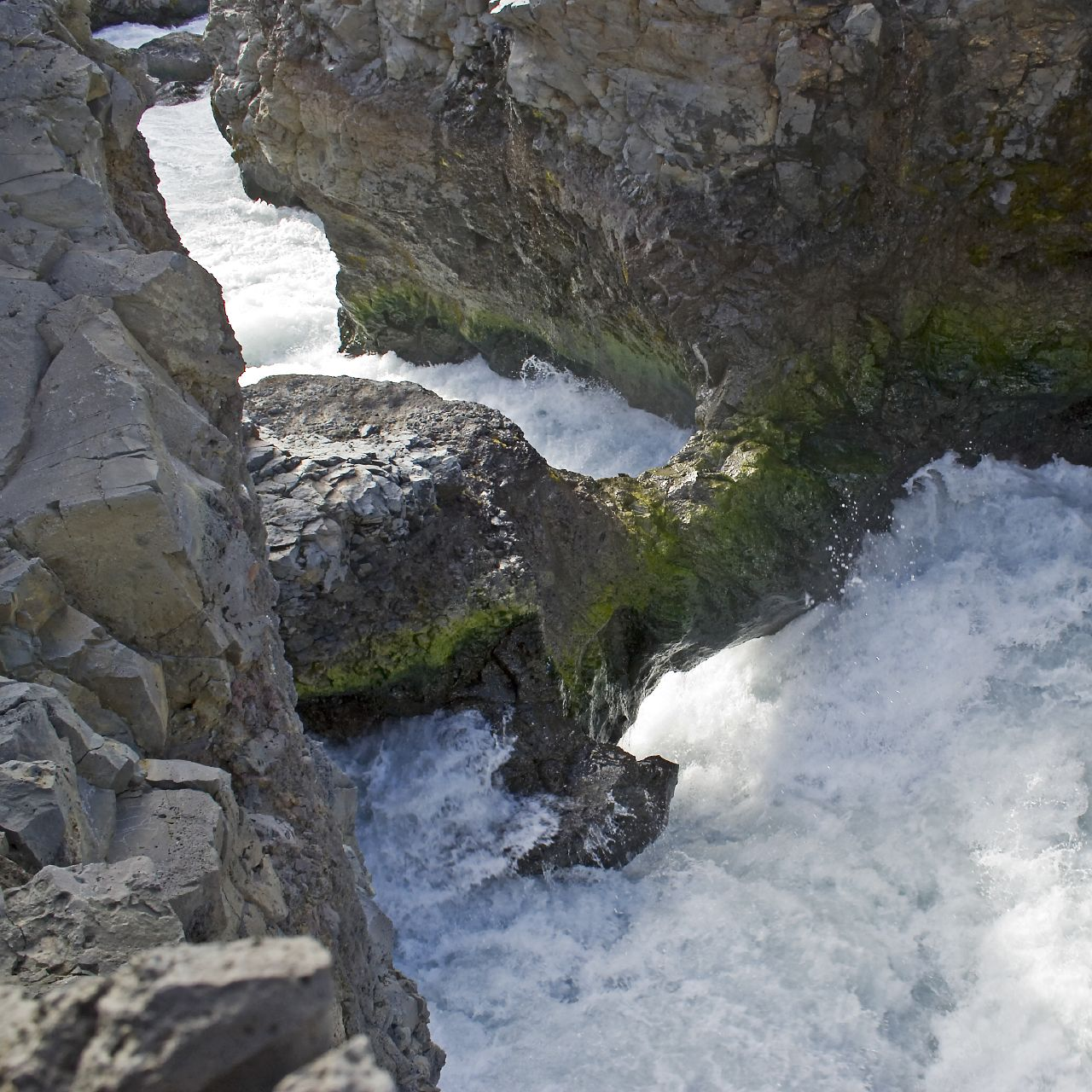
Barnafossar

- Aldeyjarfoss
- Barnafossar
- Ófærufoss

=== India ===
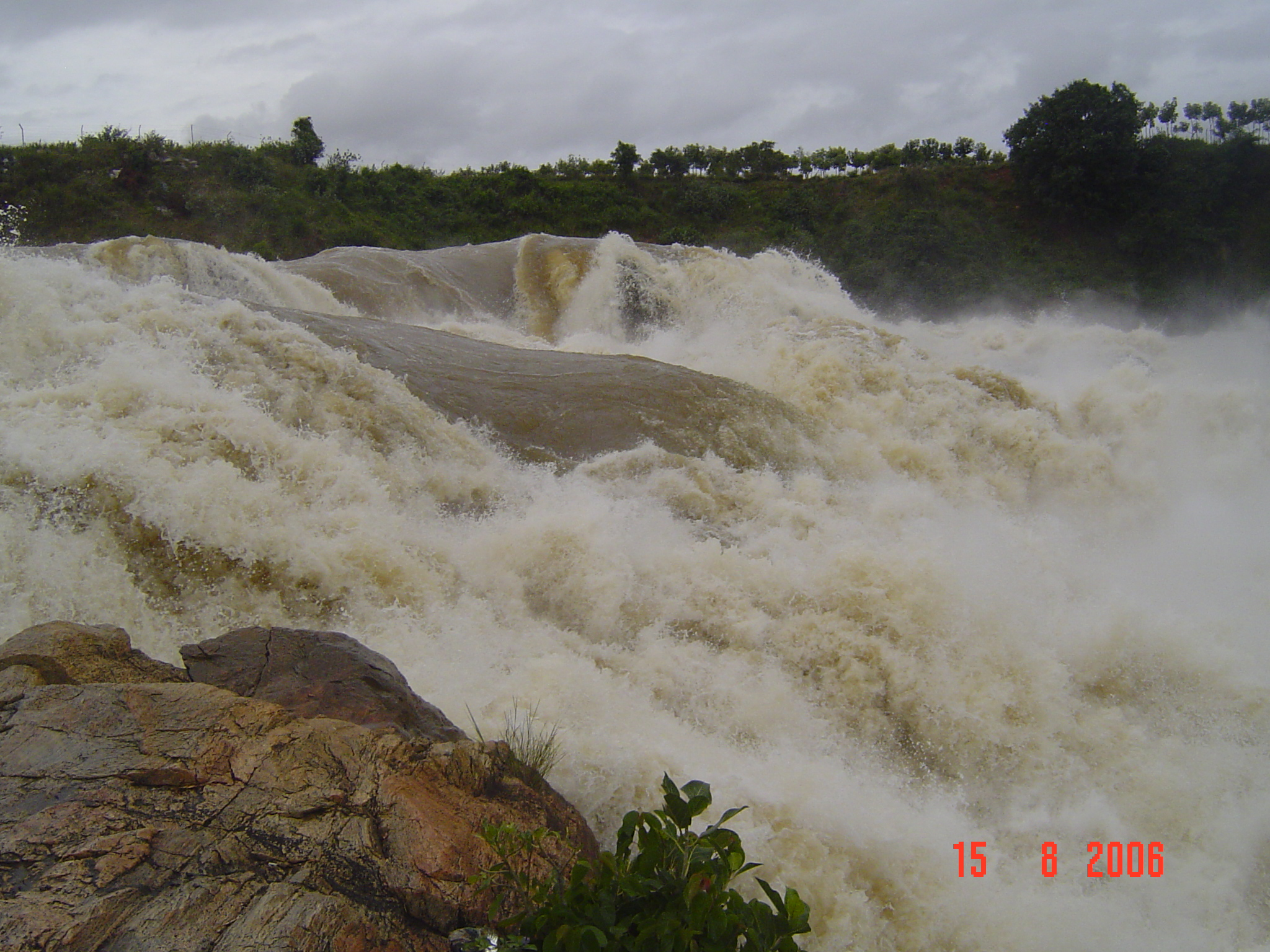
Chunchanakatte Falls

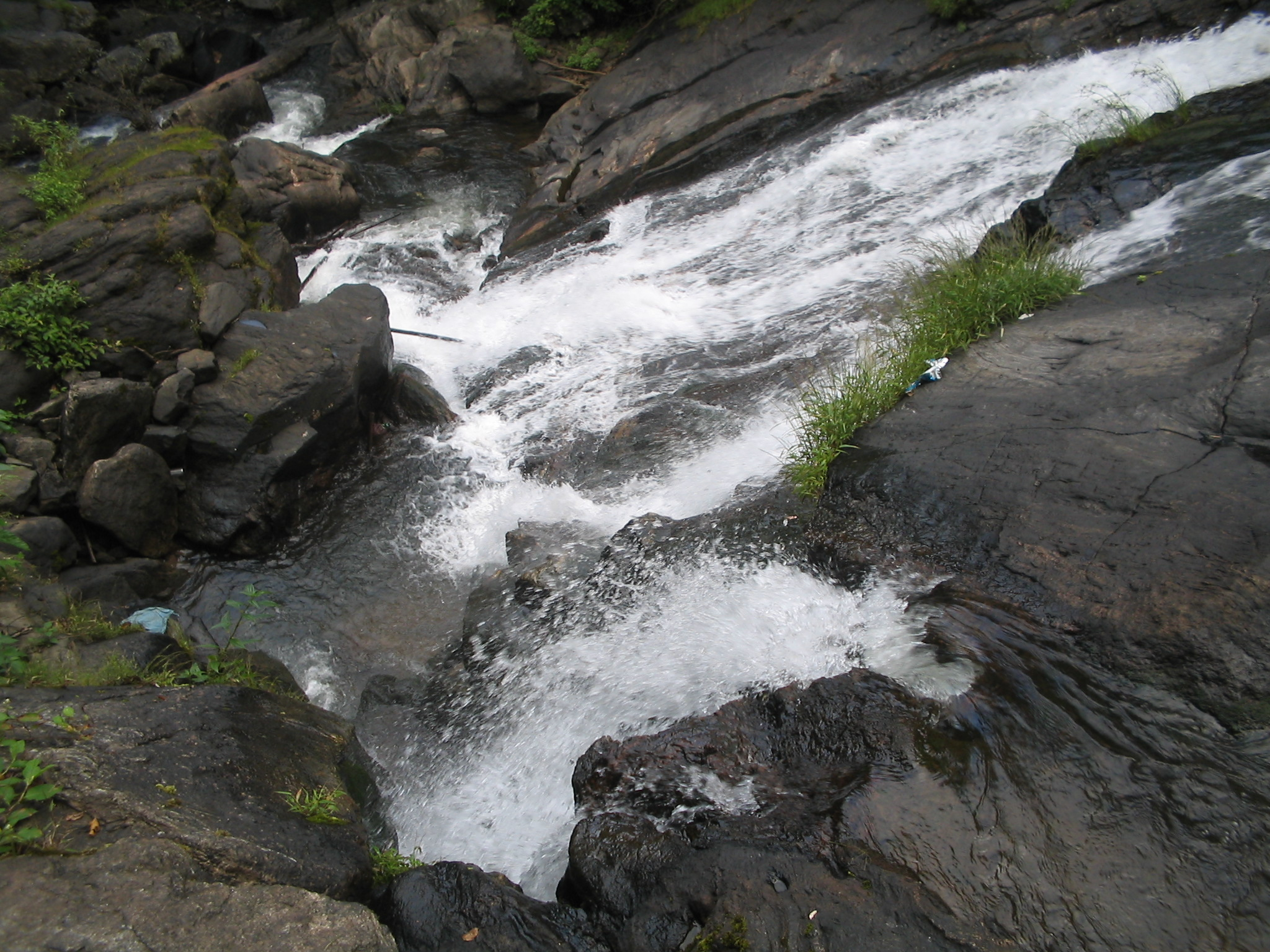
Irupu Falls

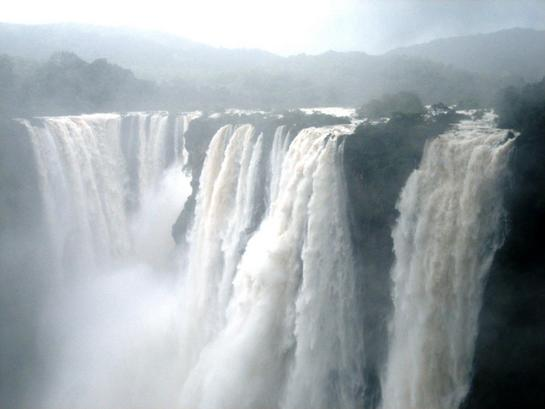
Jog Falls

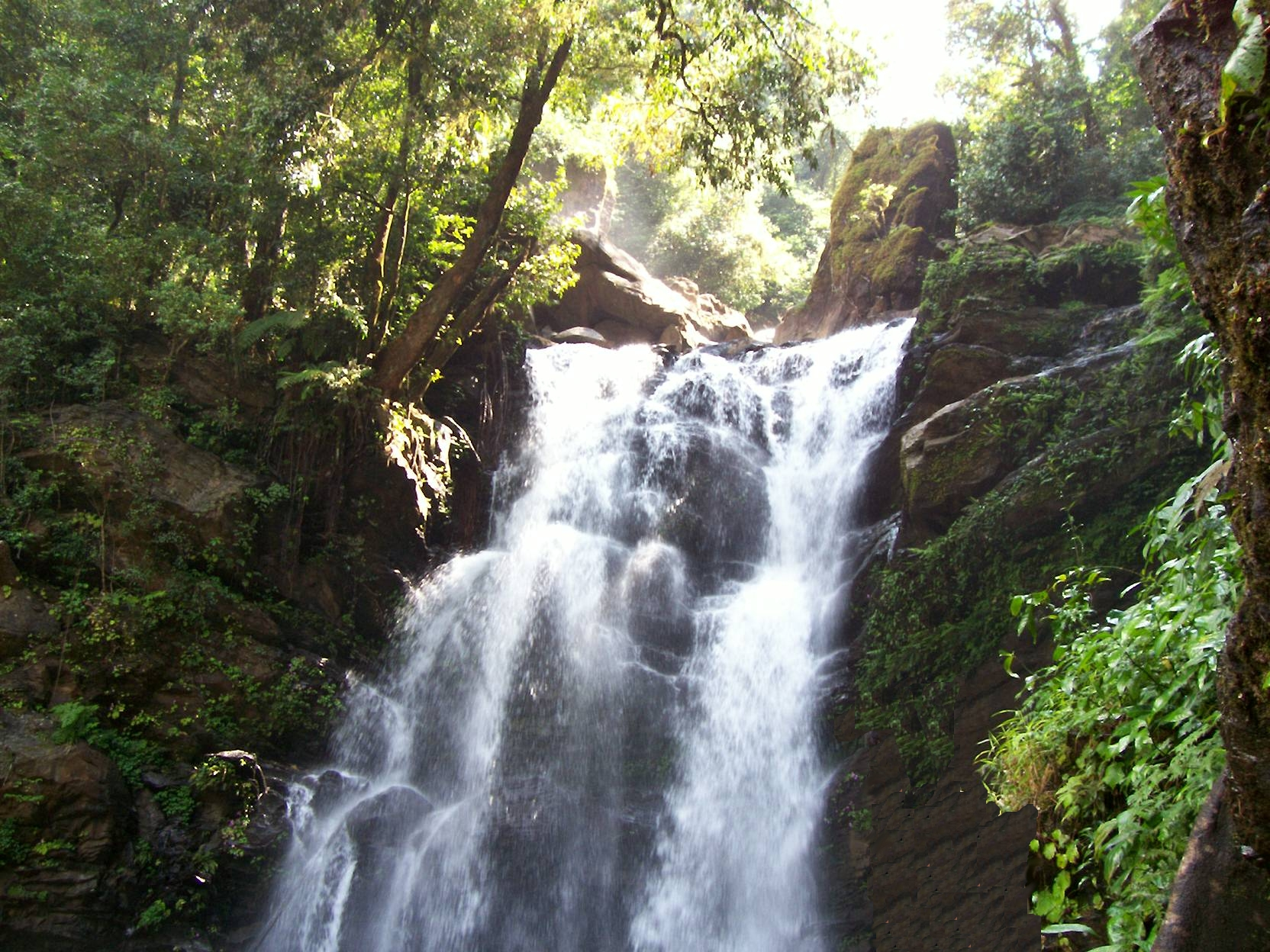
Hanumangundi Falls

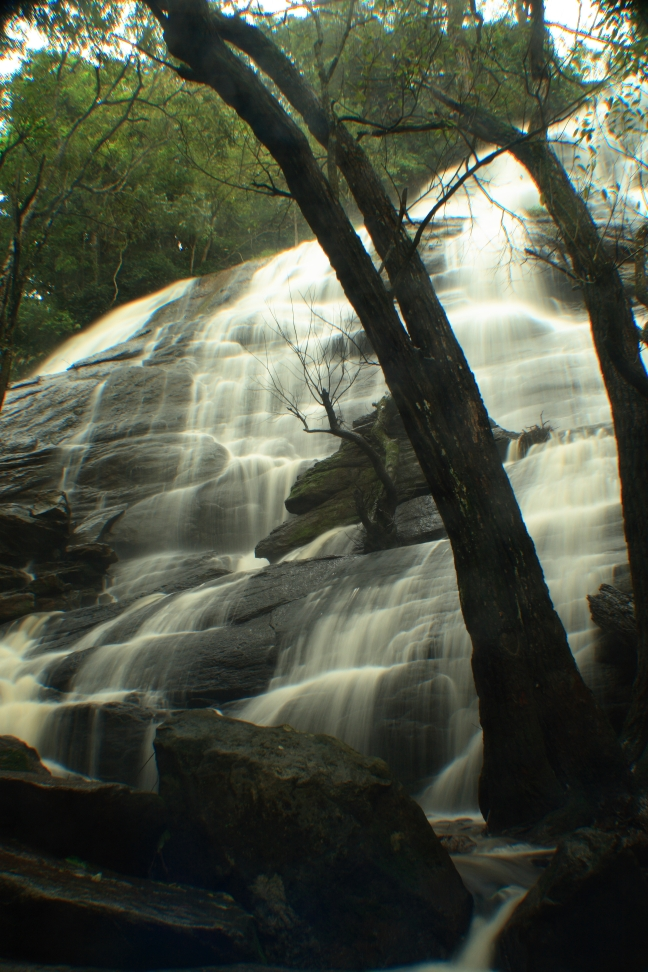
Kiliyur Falls

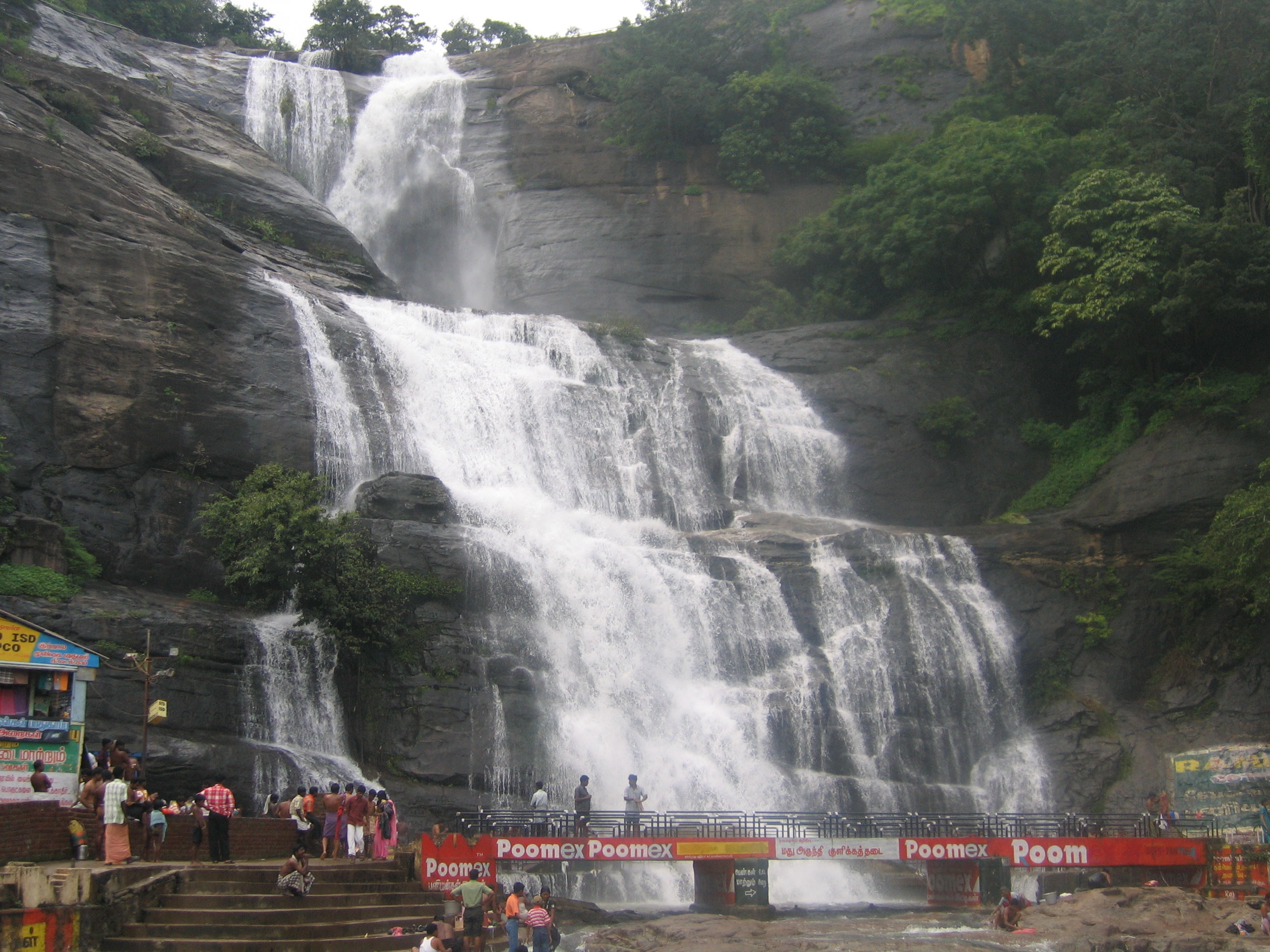
Courtallam falls

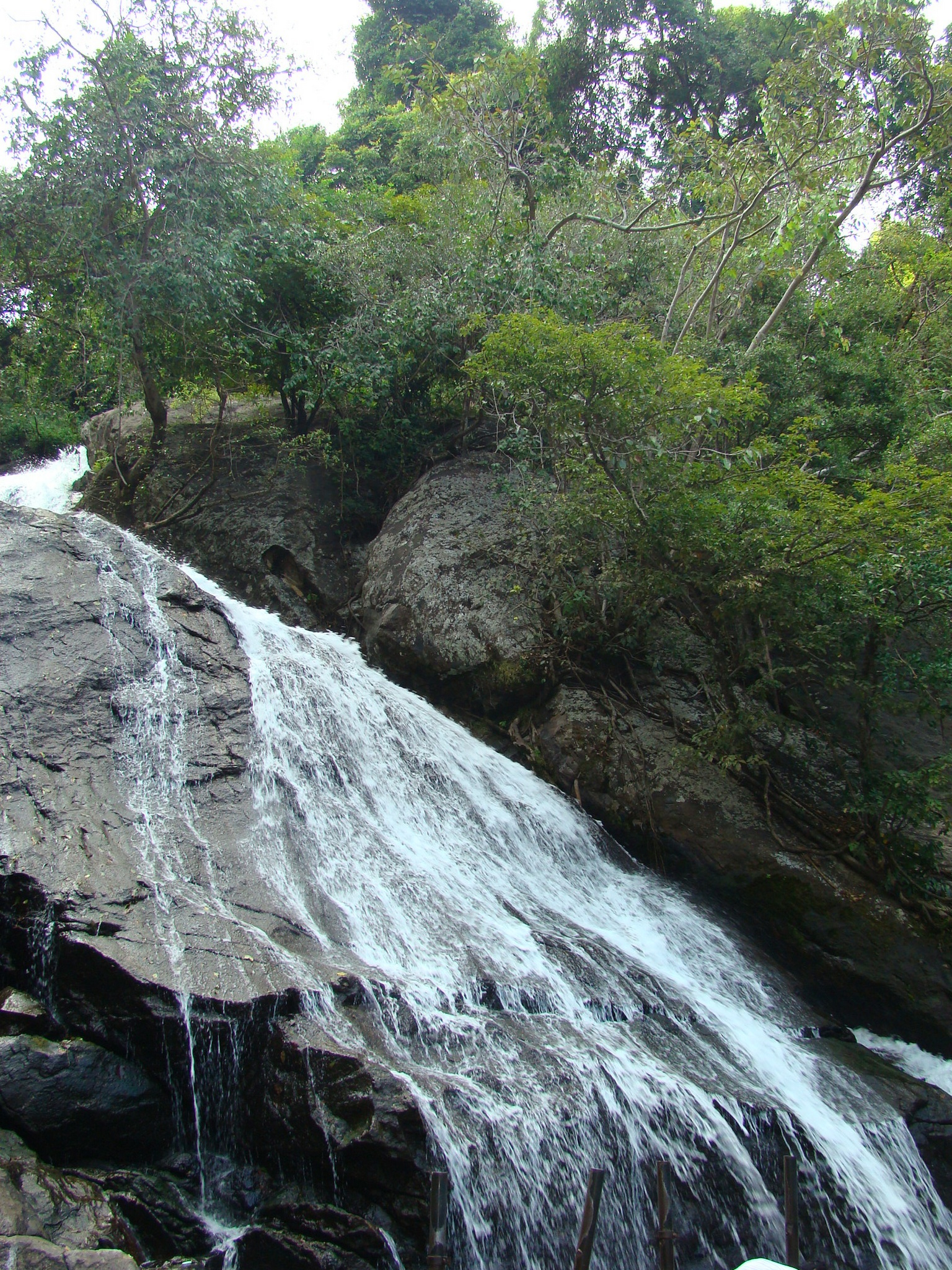
Monkey Falls

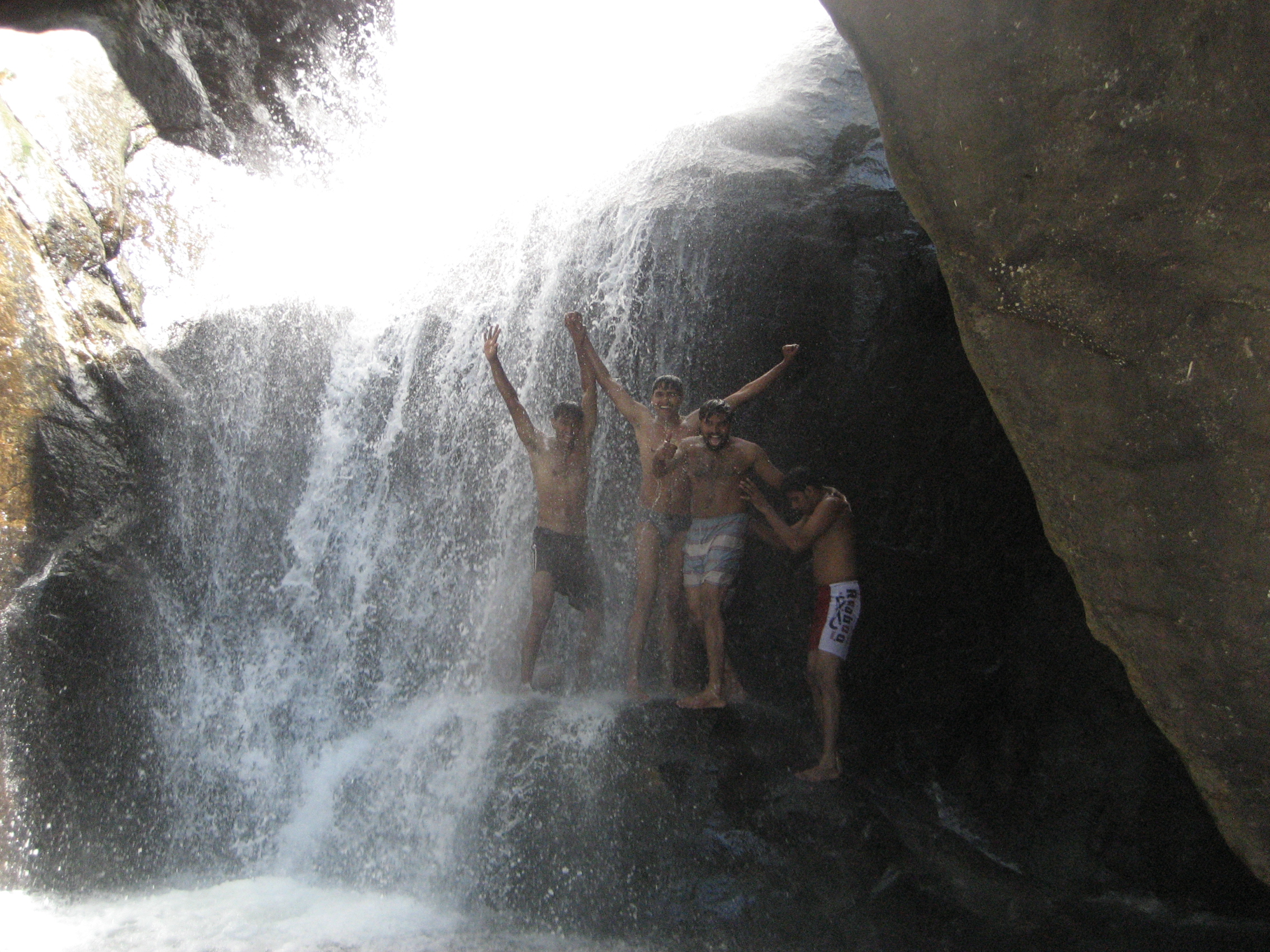
Ullakaarvi falls

- Chunchanakatte Falls
- Courtallam
- Hanumangundi falls
- Irupu Falls
- Jog Falls
- Kiliyur Falls
- Monkey Falls
- Siruvani Waterfalls
- Thusharagiri Falls
- Ullakaarvi
- Vazhachal Falls

=== Jamaica ===
- Dunn's River Falls

=== Laos ===
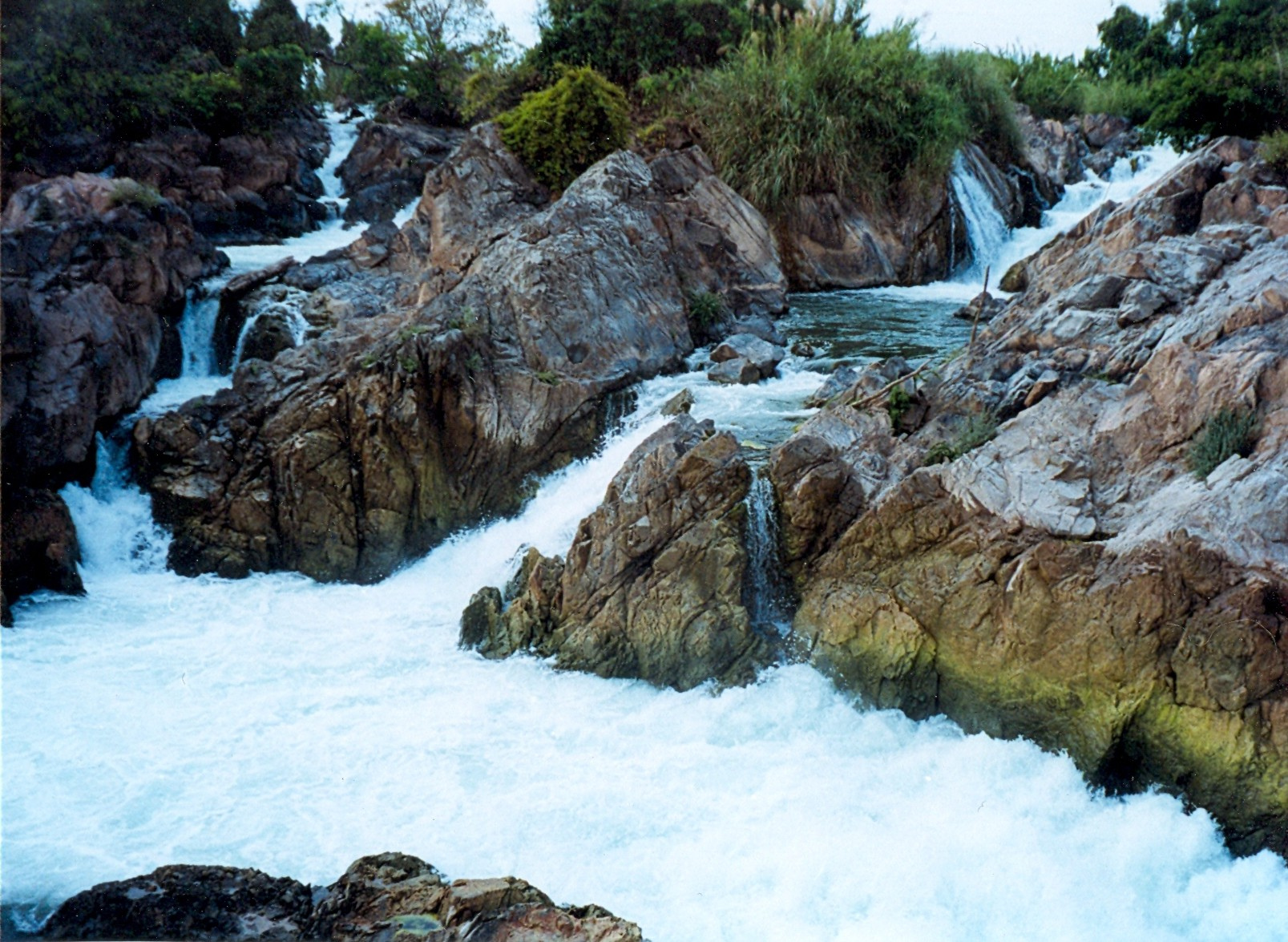
Khone Phapheng Falls

- Khone Phapheng Falls

=== New Zealand ===
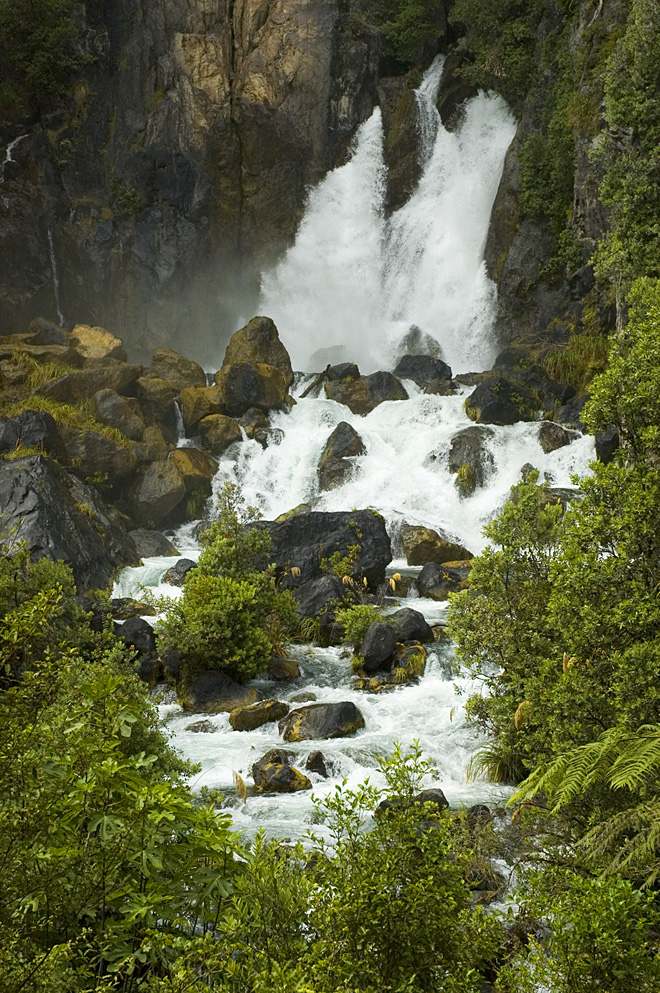
Tarawera Falls

- Āniwaniwa Falls
- Browne Falls
- Huka Falls
- Mōkau Falls
- Purakaunui Falls
- Tarawera Falls

=== North Macedonia ===
- Koprišnica Waterfall

=== Norway ===
- Kjosfossen
- Steinsdalsfossen

=== Philippines ===
- Tinuy-an Falls

=== Russia ===
- Kivach waterfall

=== Sri Lanka ===
- Baker's Falls
- Bopath Ella Falls
- Ravana Falls
- St. Clairs Falls

=== South Africa ===
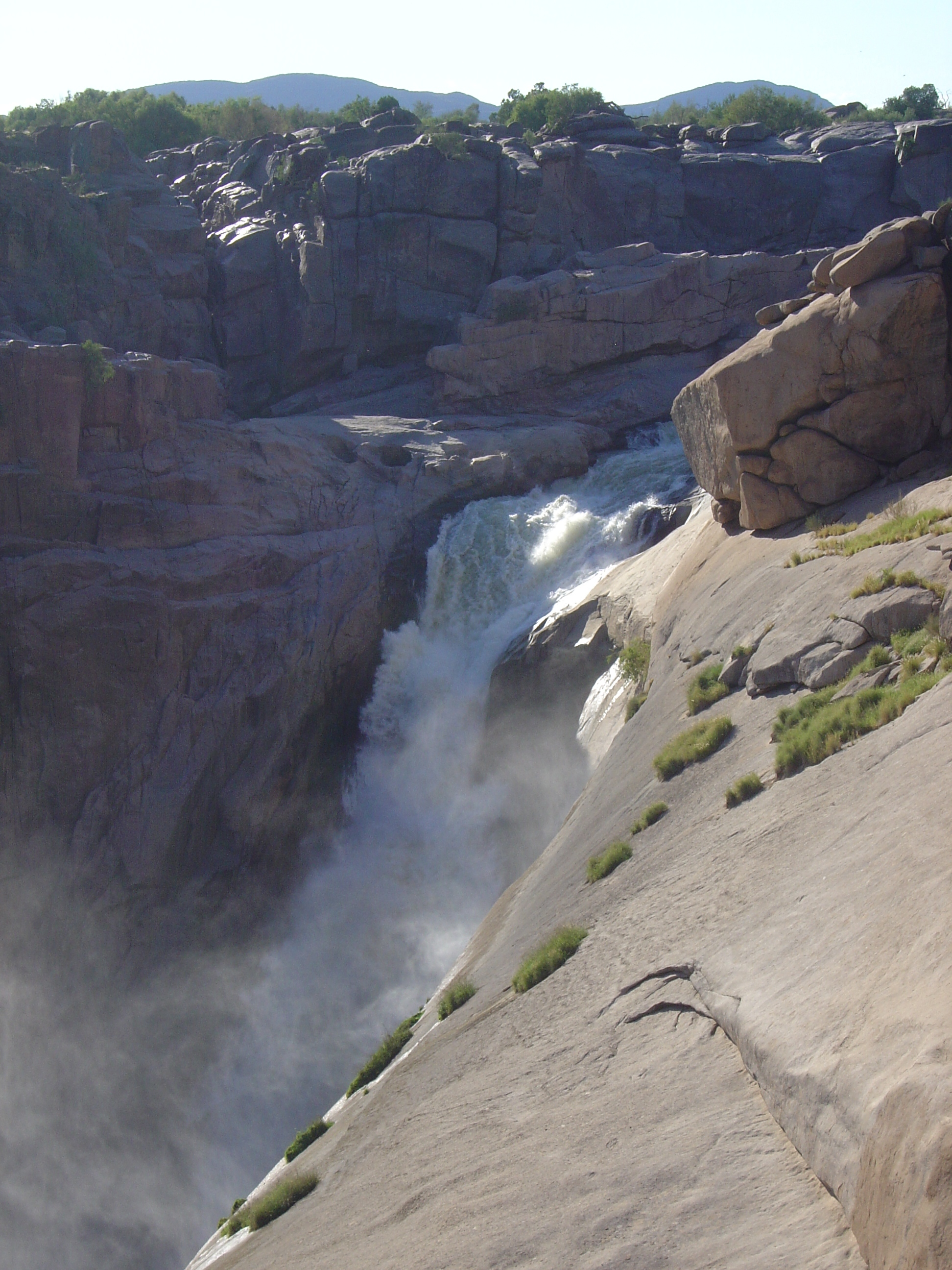
Augrabies Falls

- Augrabies Falls

=== United Kingdom ===
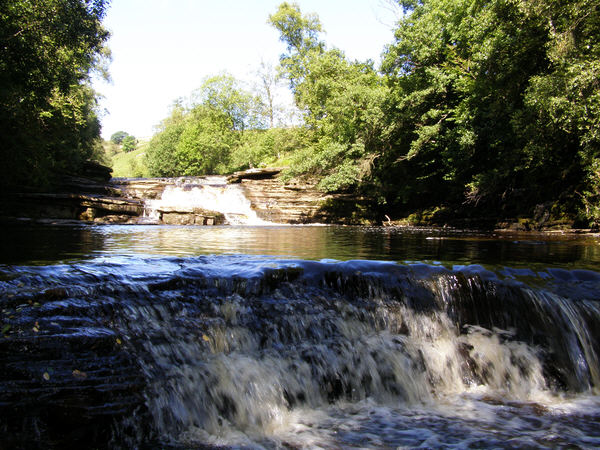
Catrake Force

- Catrake Force
- Cenarth Falls
- Conwy Falls
- Falls of Bruar
- High Force
- Swallow Falls

=== United States ===
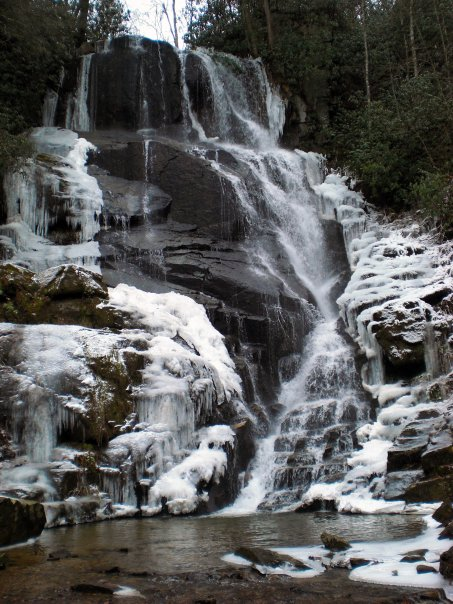
Eastatoe Falls

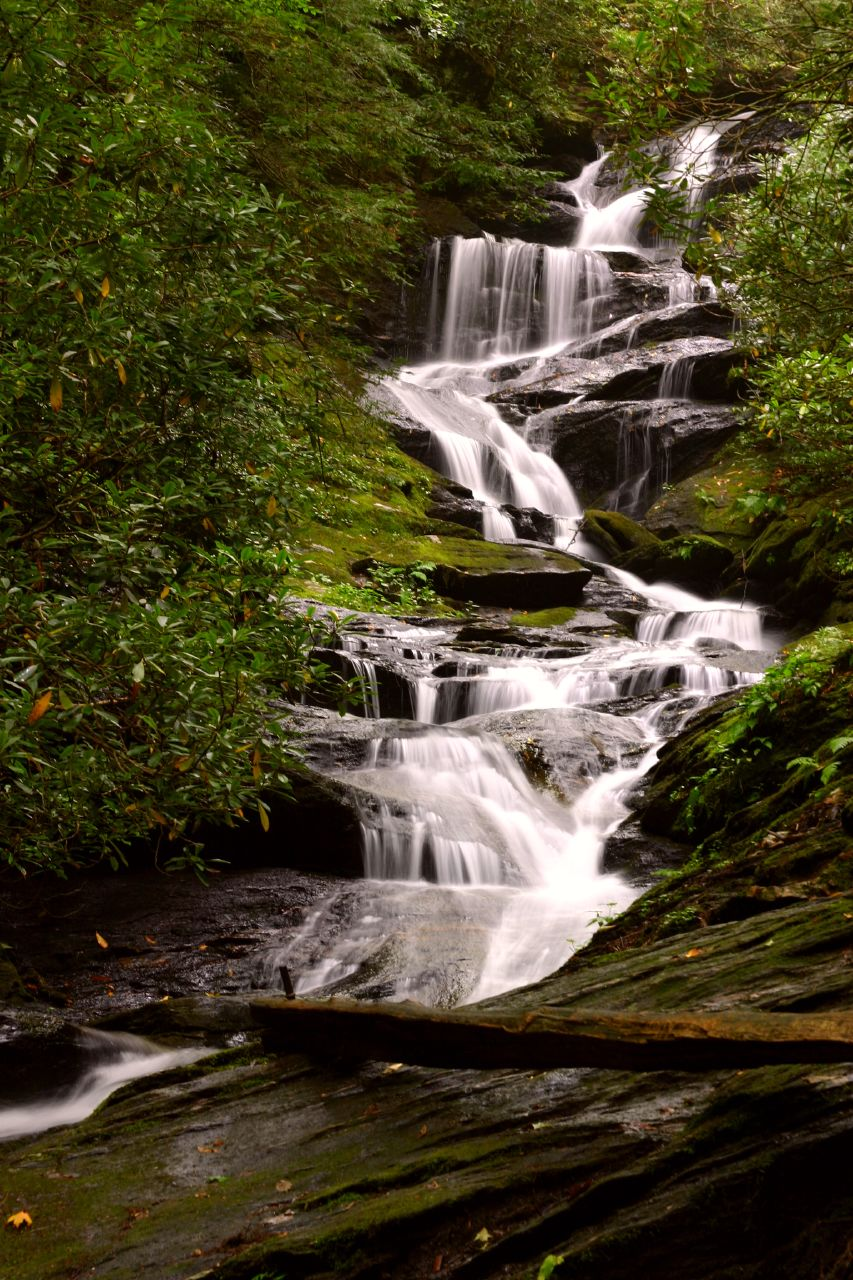
Roaring Fork Falls

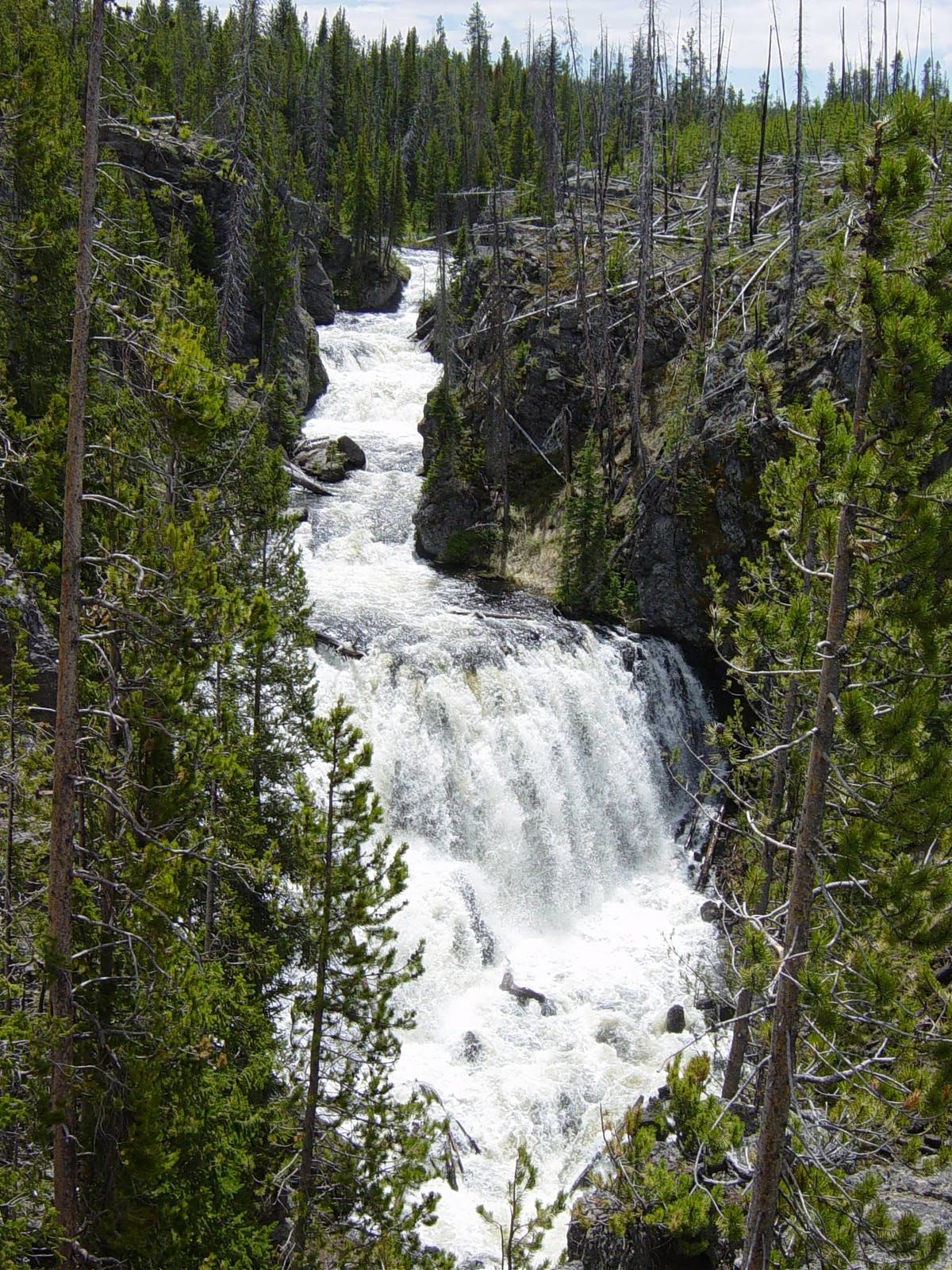
Kepler Cascades

- Batson Creek Falls
- Bechler Falls
- Big Manitou Falls
- Blackwater Falls State Park
- Bridal Veil Falls (DuPont State Forest)
- Burgess Falls
- Cascade Falls
- Connestee Falls
- Corbin Creek Falls
- Crabtree Falls
- Cullasaja Falls
- Cunningham Falls State Park
- Dingmans Falls
- Eastatoe Falls
- Firehole Falls
- Fulmer Falls
- Gibbon Falls
- Gooseberry Falls
- Grand Falls
- Hidden Falls
- Isaqueena Falls
- Kepler Cascades
- Key Falls
- Lewis Falls
- Lower Cascades
- Lucifer Falls
- McGalliard Falls
- Mitchell Falls
- Moravian Falls
- Mystic Falls
- Nugget Falls
- 'Opaeka'a Falls
- Rainbow Falls
- Roaring Fork Falls
- Setrock Creek Falls
- Sliding Rock
- Tory's Falls
- Triple Falls
- Turtleback Falls
- Upper Cascades
- Upper Whitewater Falls
- Virginia Cascades
- Walker Falls

=== Uganda ===
- Murchison Falls

=== Venezuela ===
- Llovizna Falls

== Segmented ==
Distinctly separate flows of water form as it descends.

=== Australia ===
- Florence Falls
- Guide Falls
- Halls Falls
- Horseshoe Falls
- Nigretta Falls
- Pencil Pine Falls
- Russell Falls

=== Bulgaria ===
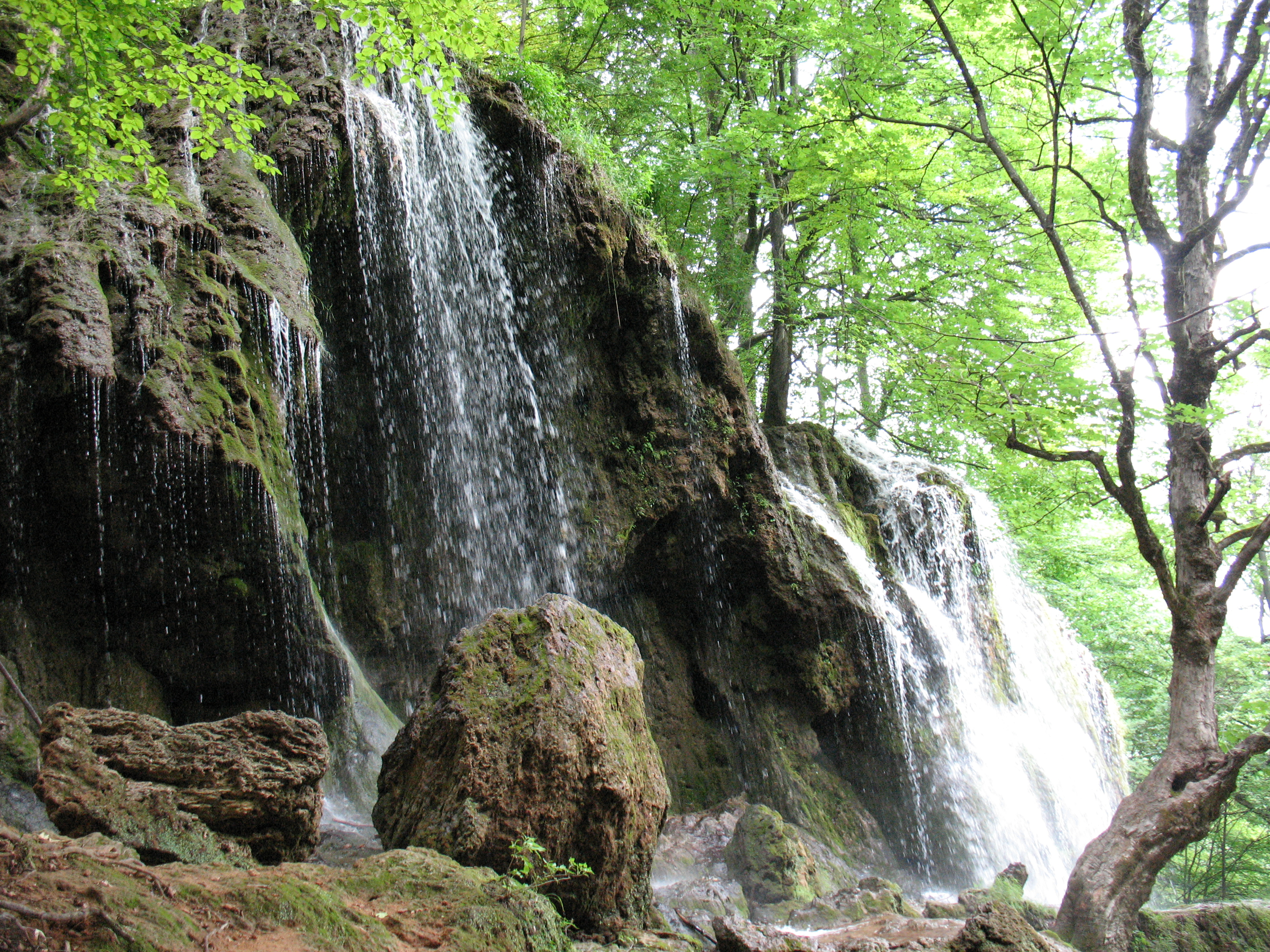
Etropole Waterfall Varovitets

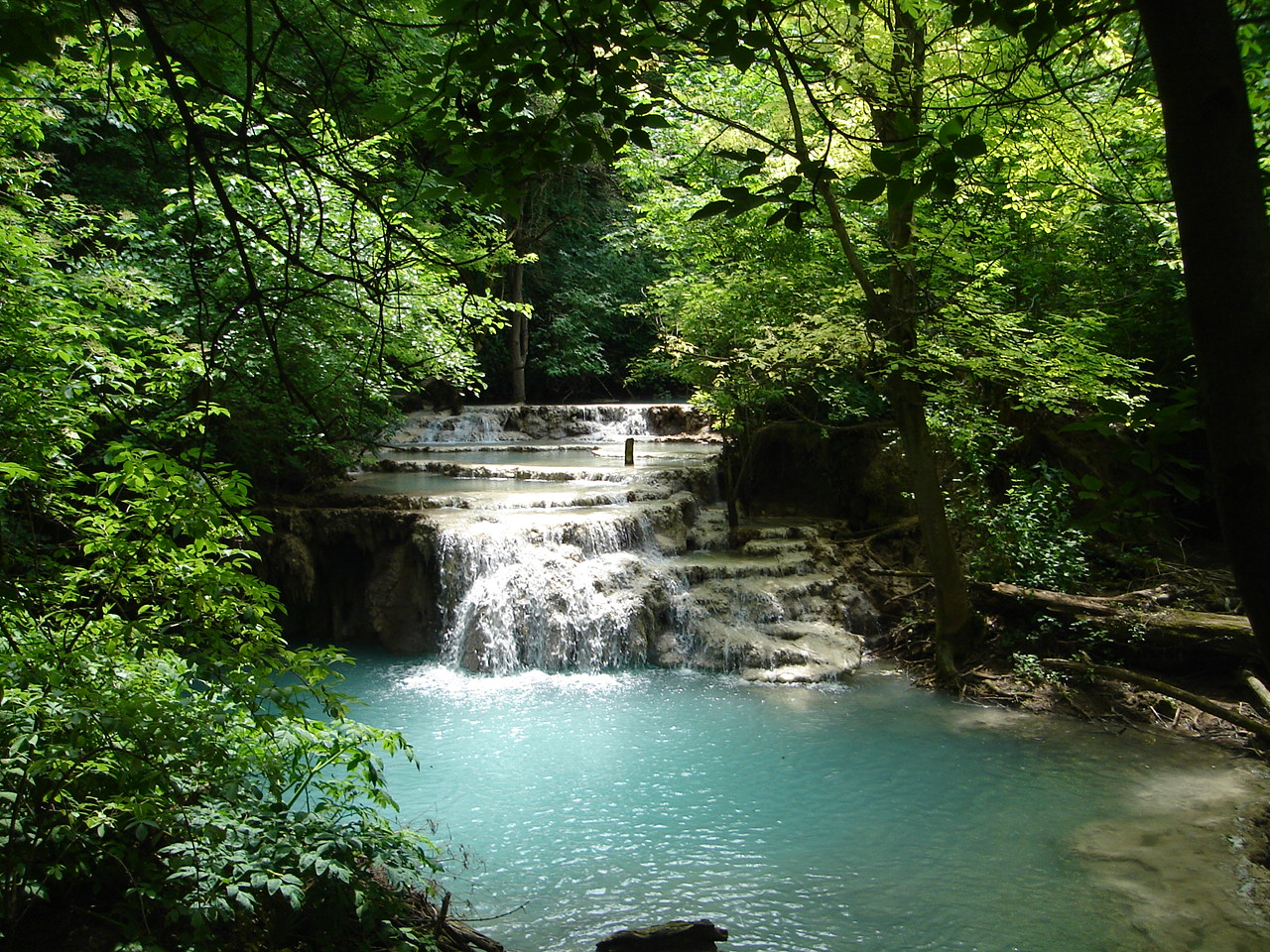
Krushuna Falls

- Etropole Waterfall Varovitets – 15 m (49 ft)
- Krushuna Falls – 15 m (49 ft)

=== Canada ===
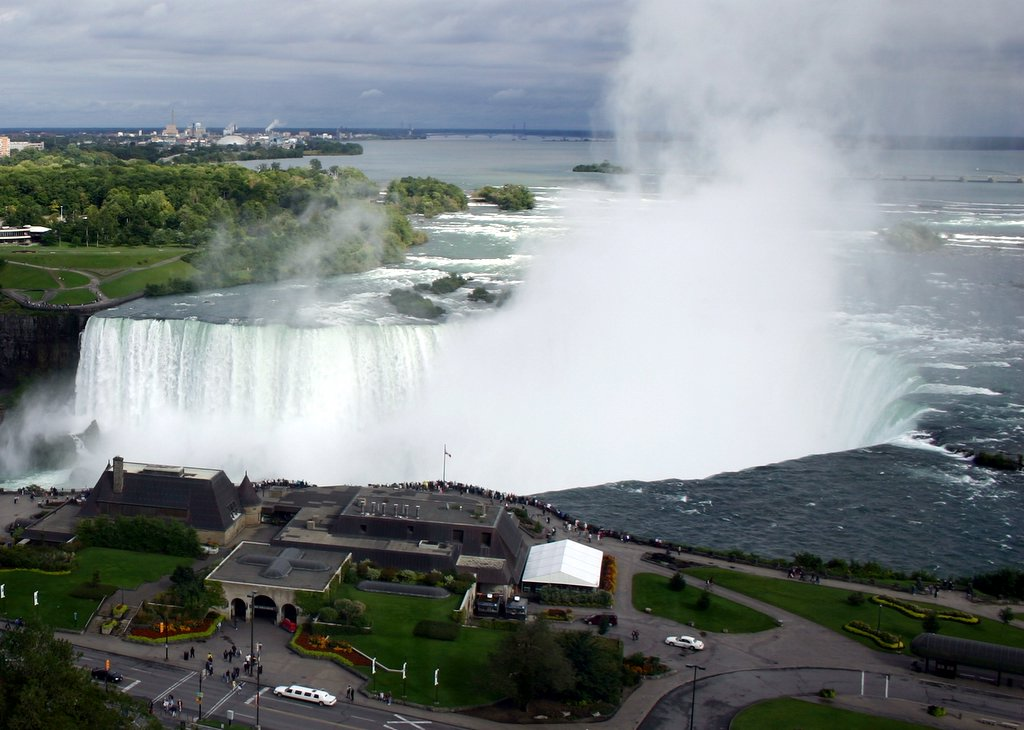
Horseshoe Falls

- Black Brook Waterfall
- Cauldron Falls
- Churchill Falls
- Della Falls
- Horseshoe Falls
- Icecap Falls
- Niagara Falls
- Nistowiak Falls
- Twin Falls
- Virginia Falls

=== Chile ===
- Laja Falls

=== China ===
- Detian – Ban Gioc Falls

=== Colombia ===
- Tequendama Falls

=== Estonia ===
- Keila Falls

=== Iceland ===
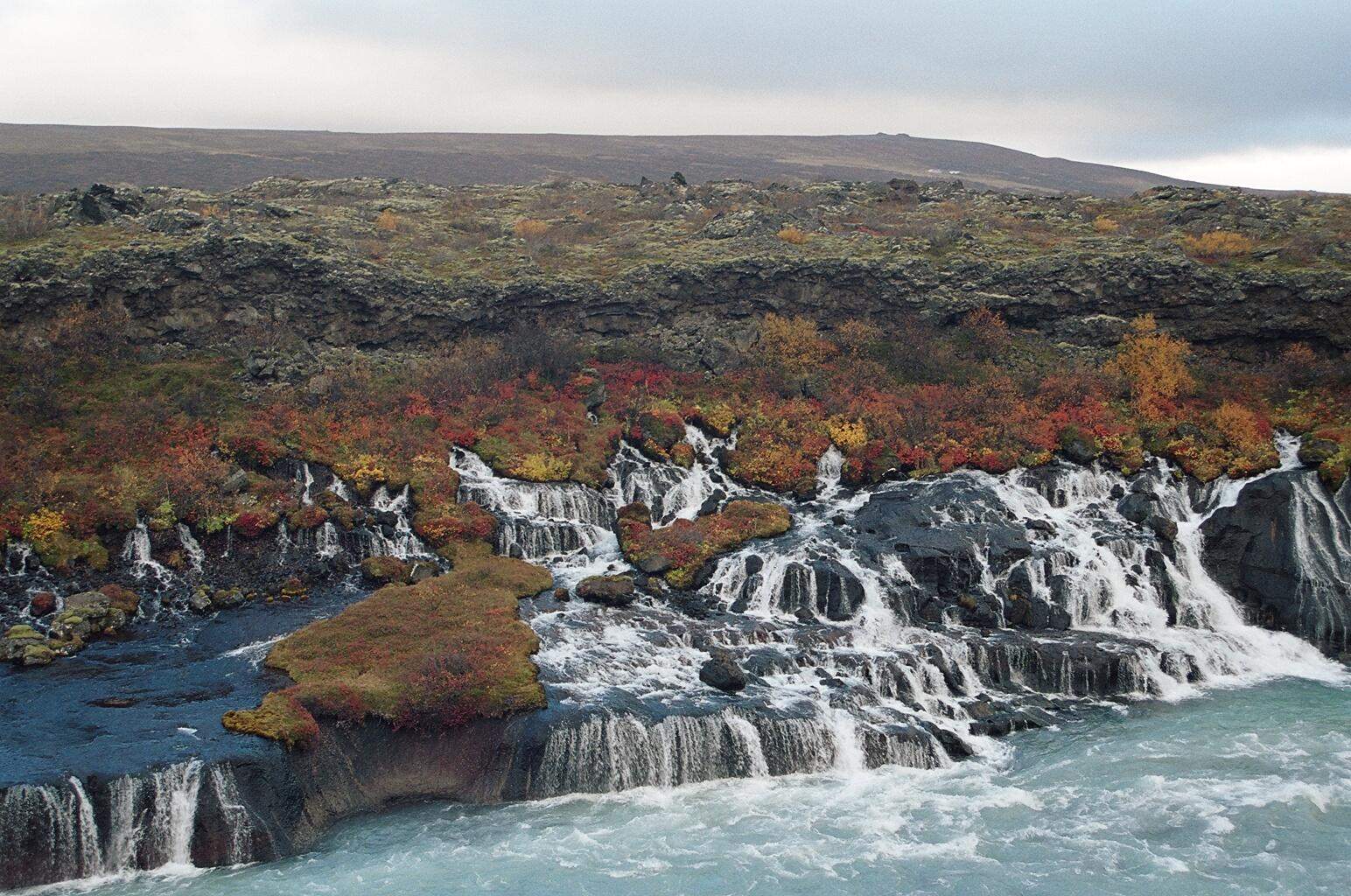
Hraunfossar

- Dettifoss
- Dynjandi
- Hraunfossar

=== India ===
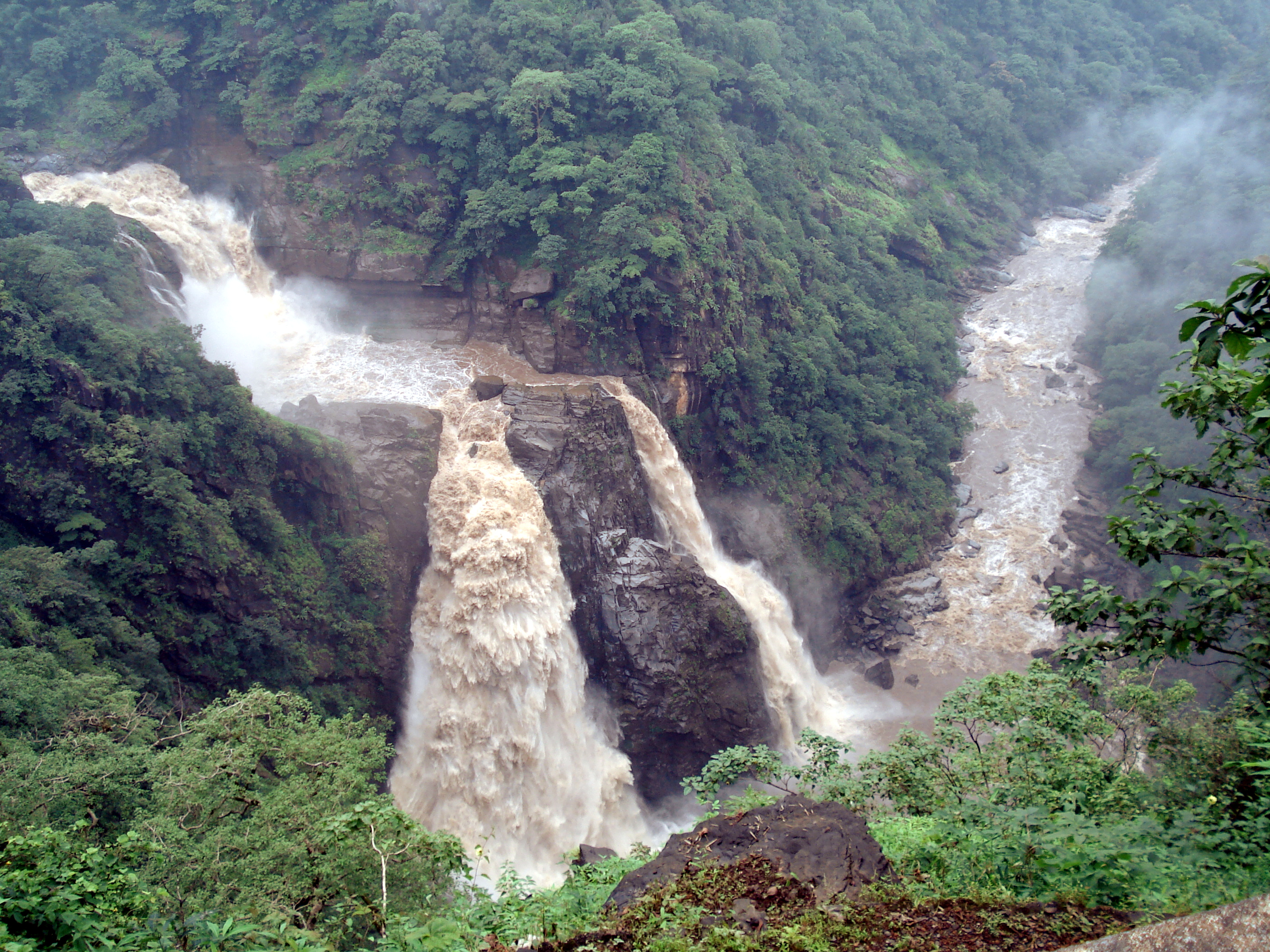
Magod Falls

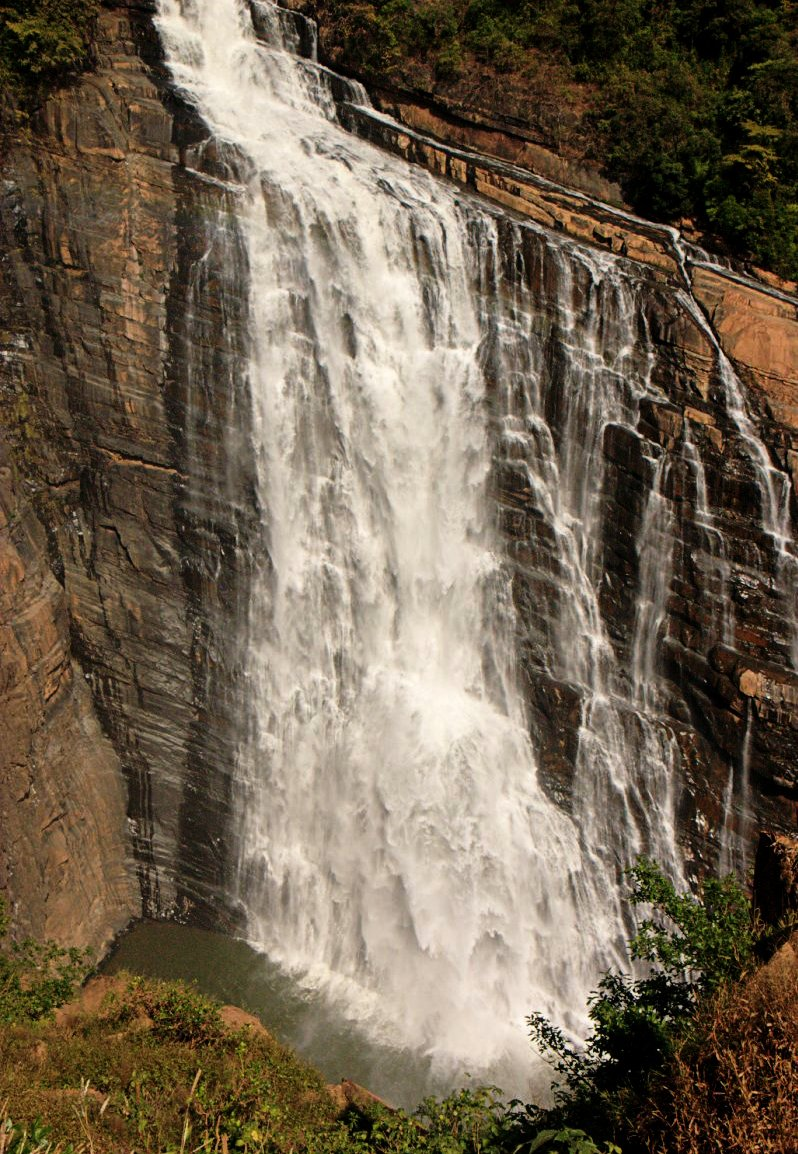
Lushington Falls

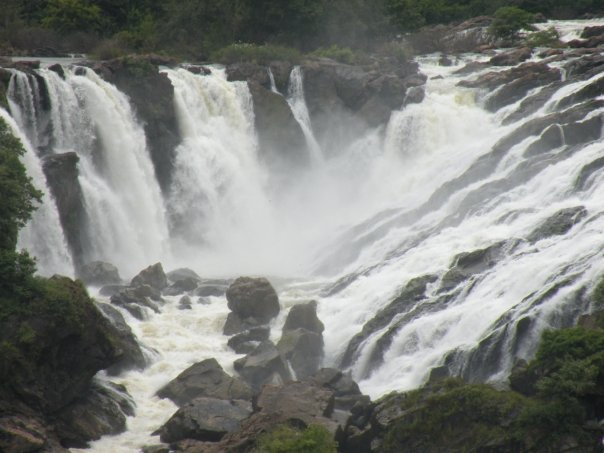
Shivanasamudra Falls

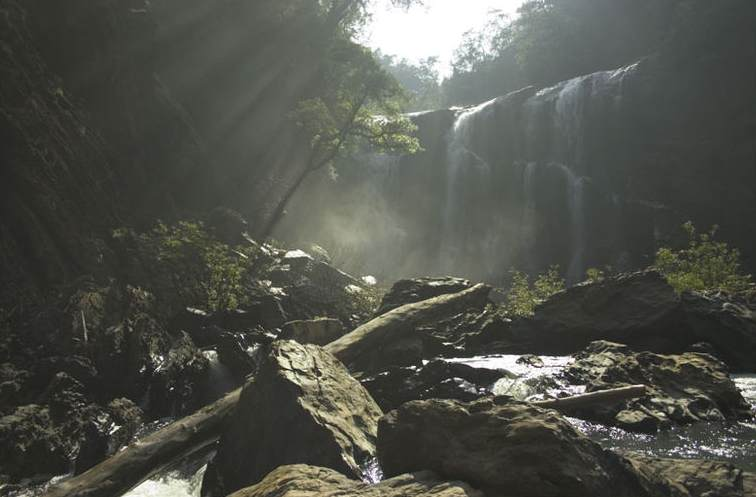
Sathodi Falls

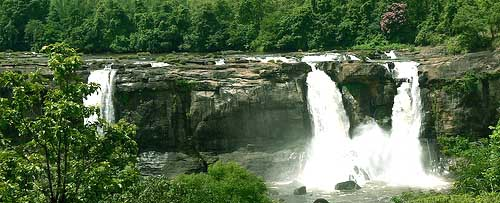
Athirappilly Falls

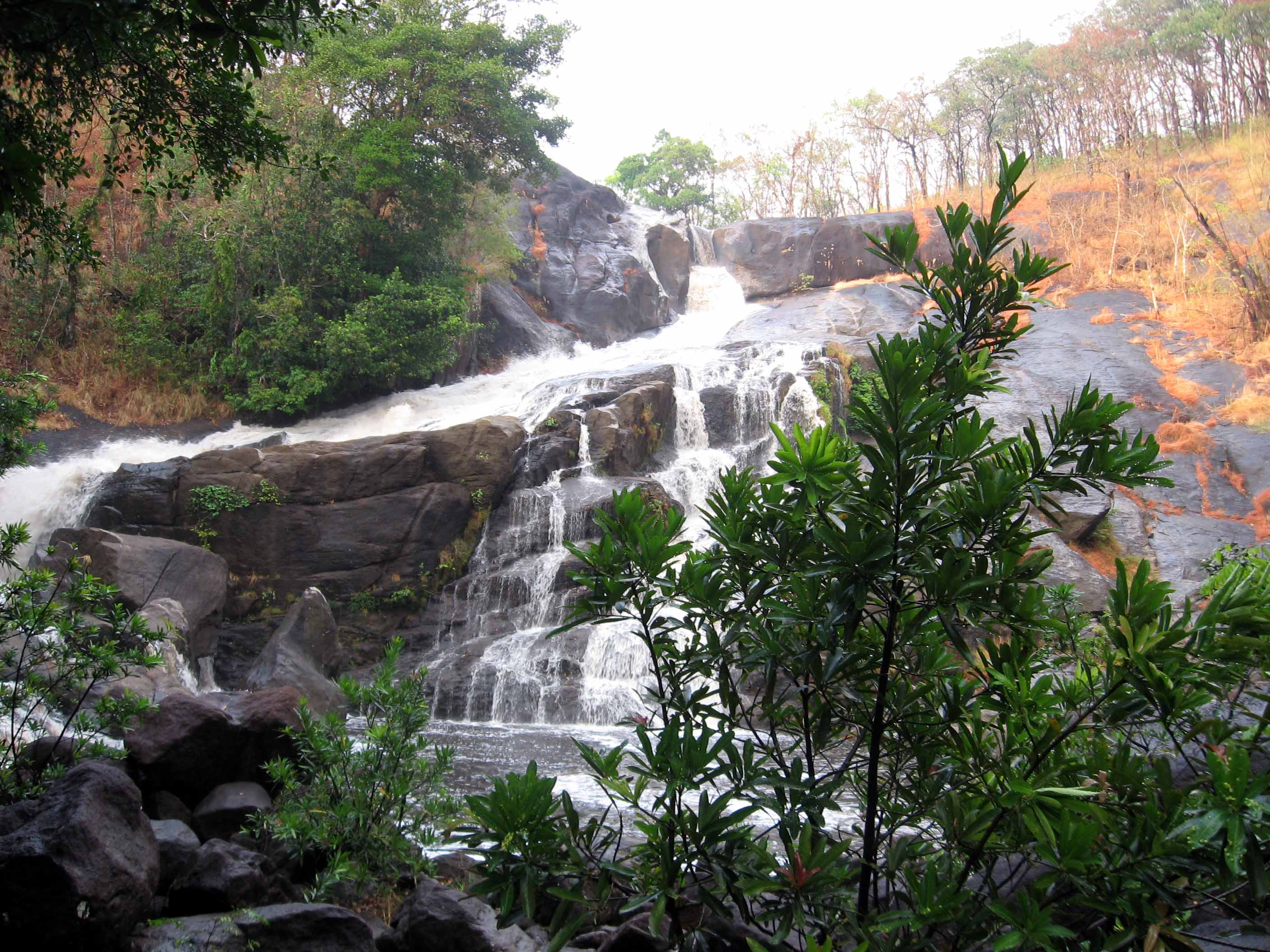
Meenmutty Falls

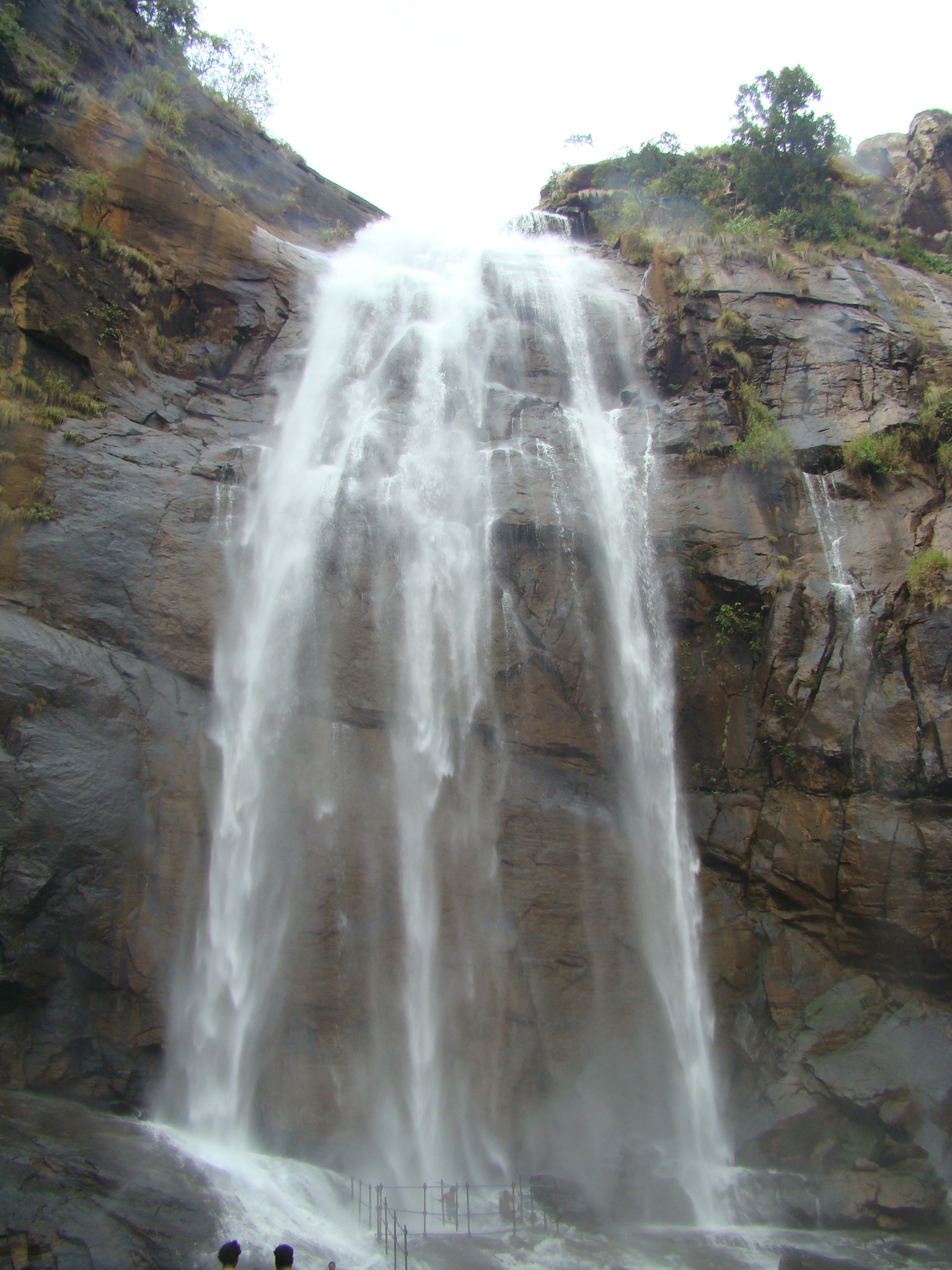
Agaya Gangai

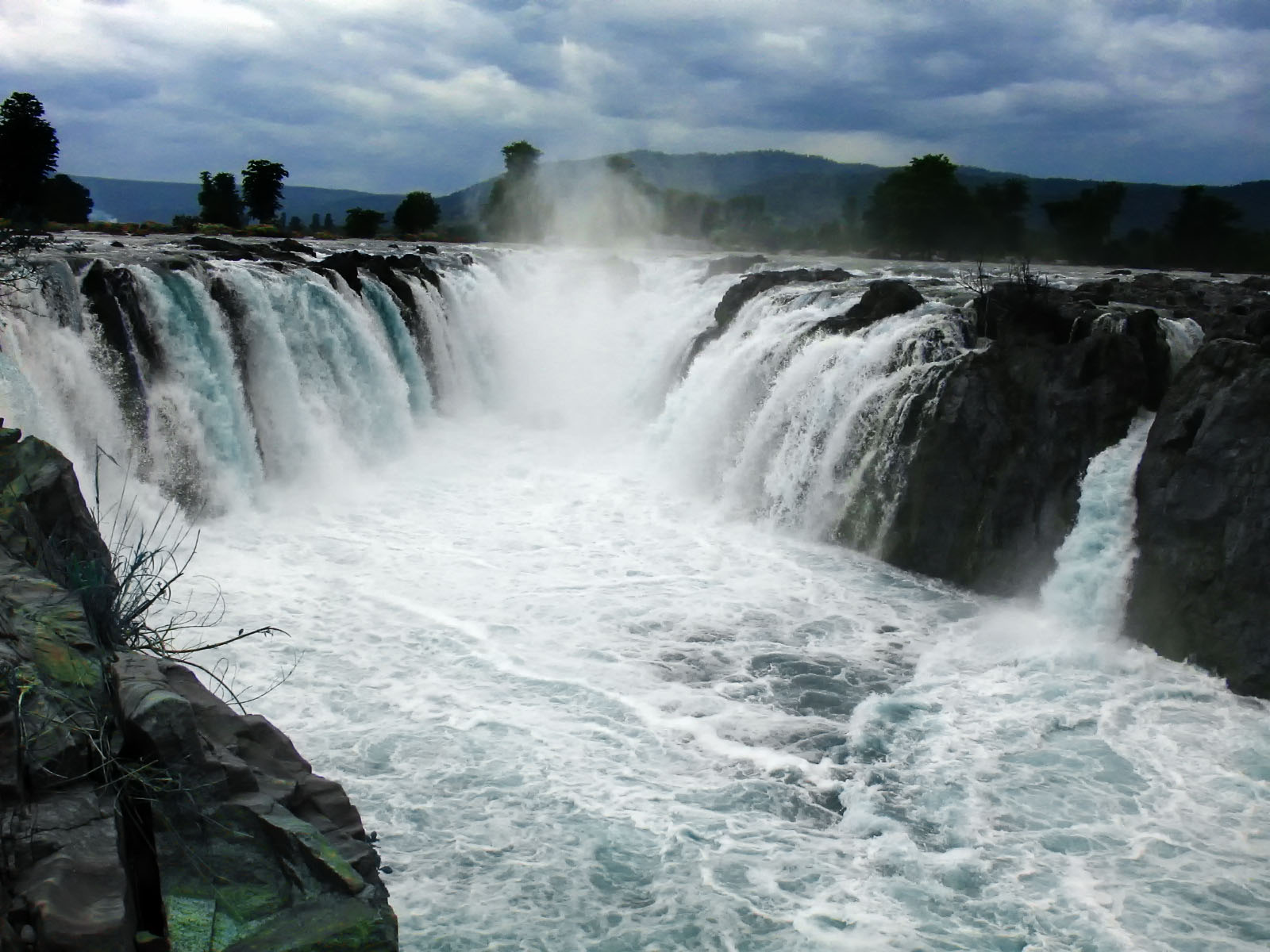
Hogenakkal Falls

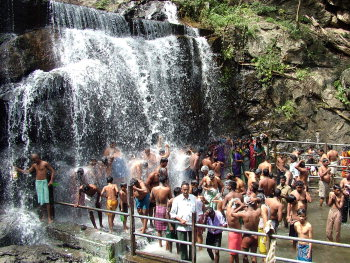
Suruli Falls

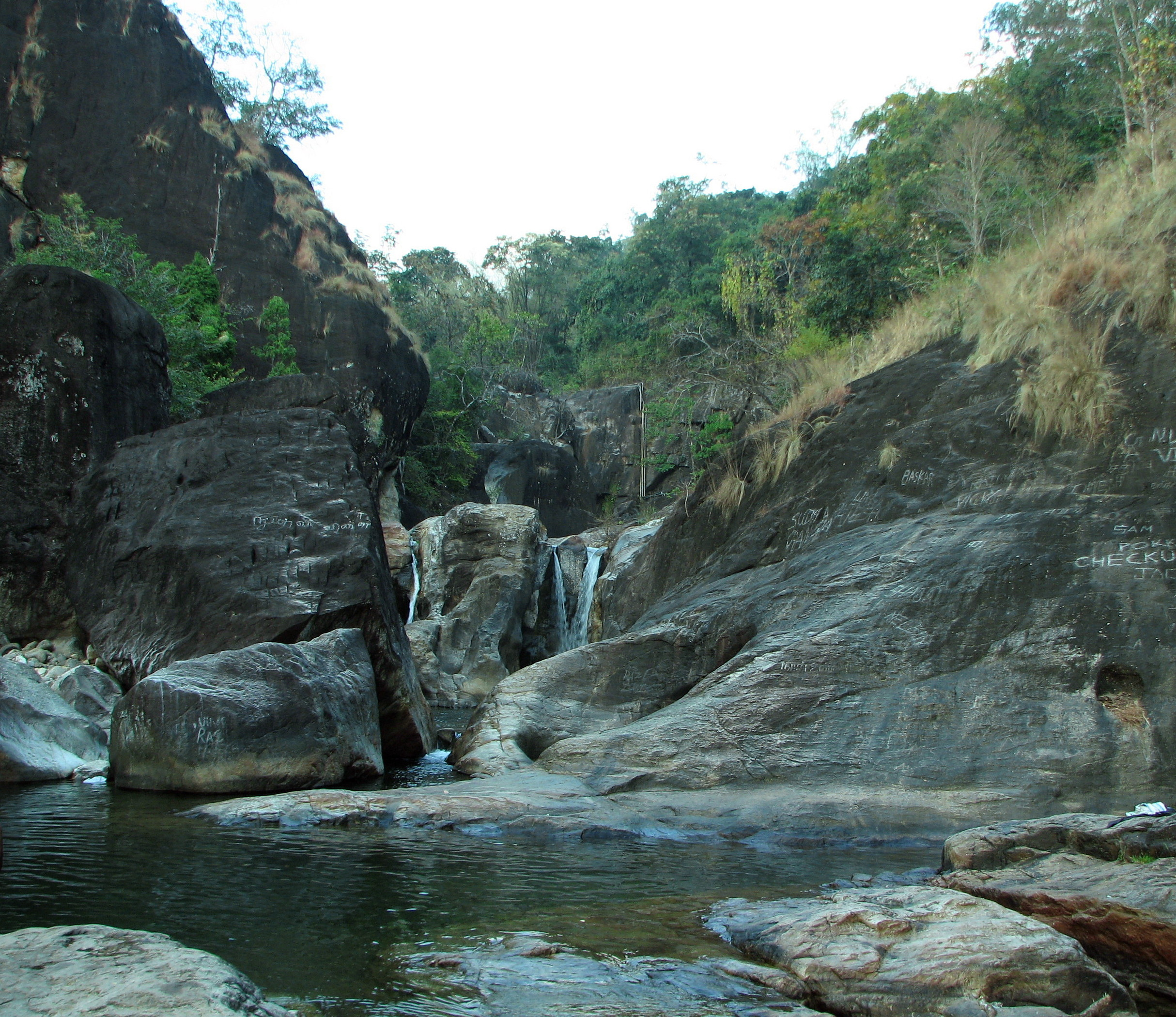
Vattaparai Falls

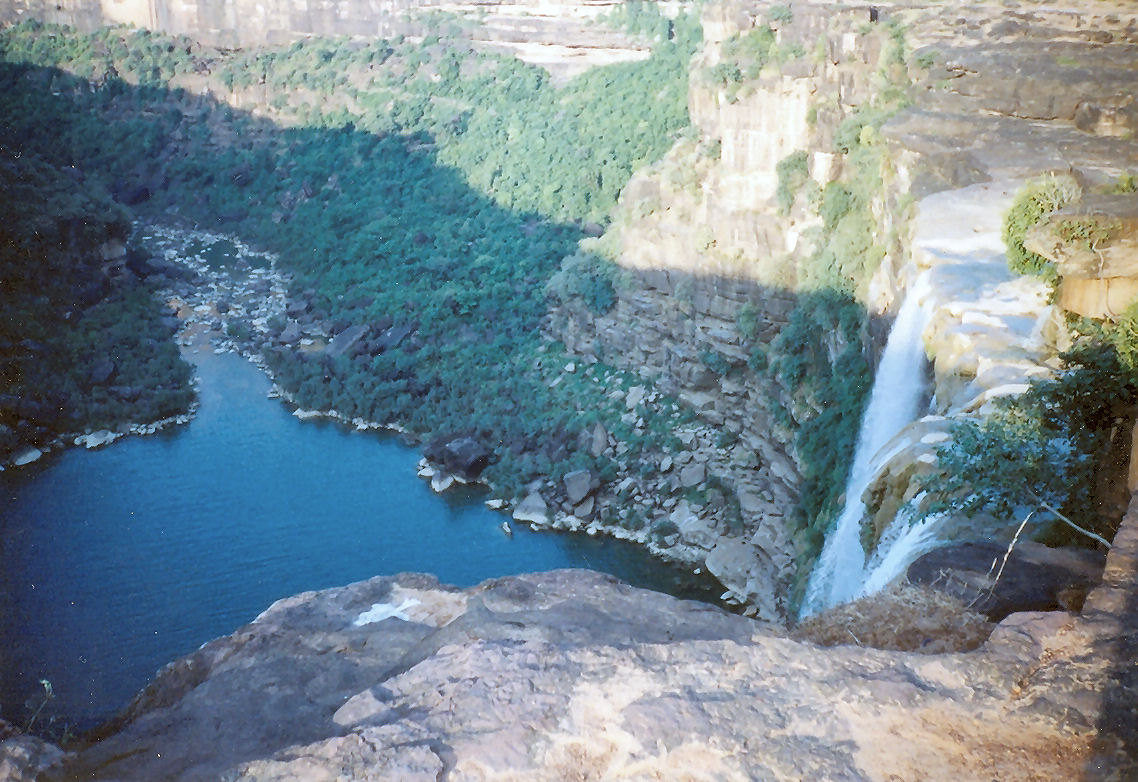
Keoti Falls

- Agaya Gangai
- Athirappilly Falls
- Hogenakkal Falls
- Keoti Falls
- Lushington Falls
- Magod Falls
- Meenmutty Falls
- Sathodi Falls
- Shivanasamudra Falls
- Suruli Falls
- Vattaparai Falls

=== Iran ===
- Margoon Waterfall

=== Japan ===
- Ryūzu Falls

=== Namibia ===
- Ruacana Falls

=== North Macedonia ===
- Kolešino Waterfall

=== Norway ===
- Rjukandefossen
- Seven Sisters

=== Thailand ===
- Umphang Thee Lor Sue Waterfall

=== Turkey ===
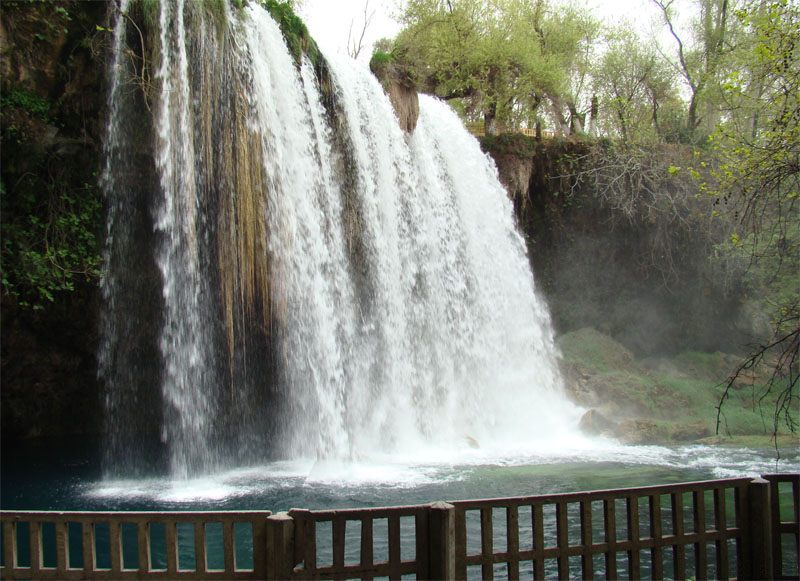
Düden Waterfalls

- Düden Waterfalls

=== United Kingdom ===
- Mynach Falls

=== United States ===
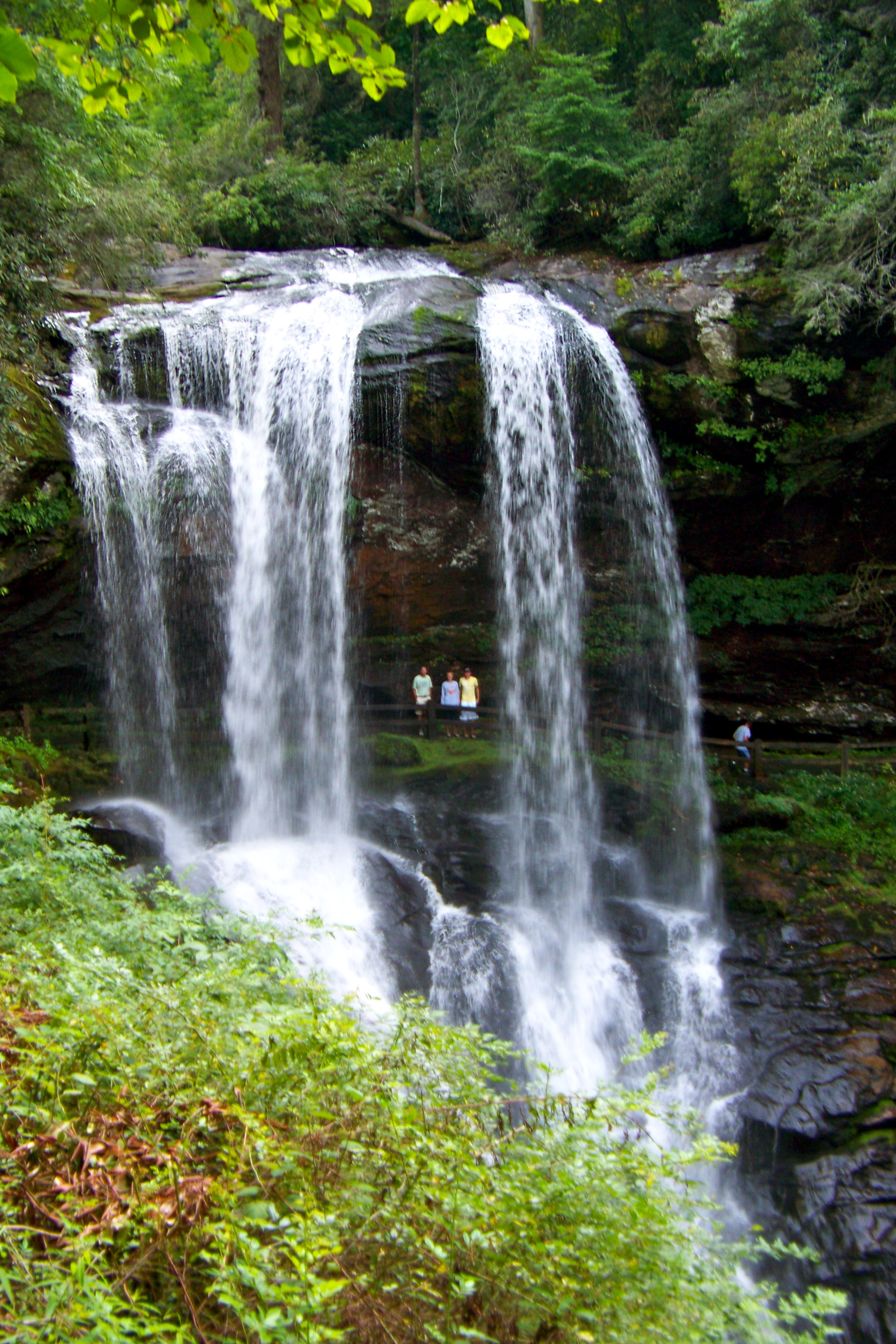
Dry Falls

- Blum Basin Falls
- Burney Falls
- Depot Creek Falls
- Dry Falls
- Elakala falls
- Great Falls
- Three Chute Falls

== Tiered ==
Water drops in a series of distinct steps or falls.

=== Australia ===
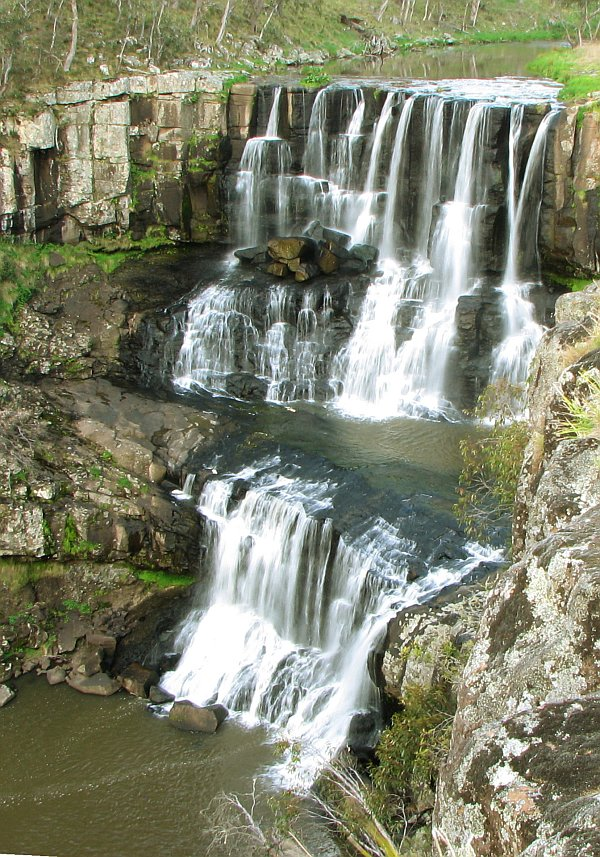
Ebor Falls

- Apsley Falls
- Ebor Falls
- Lesmurdie Falls
- Montezuma Falls
- New Town Falls
- Second Falls
- Tin Mine Falls
- Twin Falls
- Wentworth Falls
- Wollomombi Falls

=== Belize ===
- Big Rock Falls

=== Canada ===
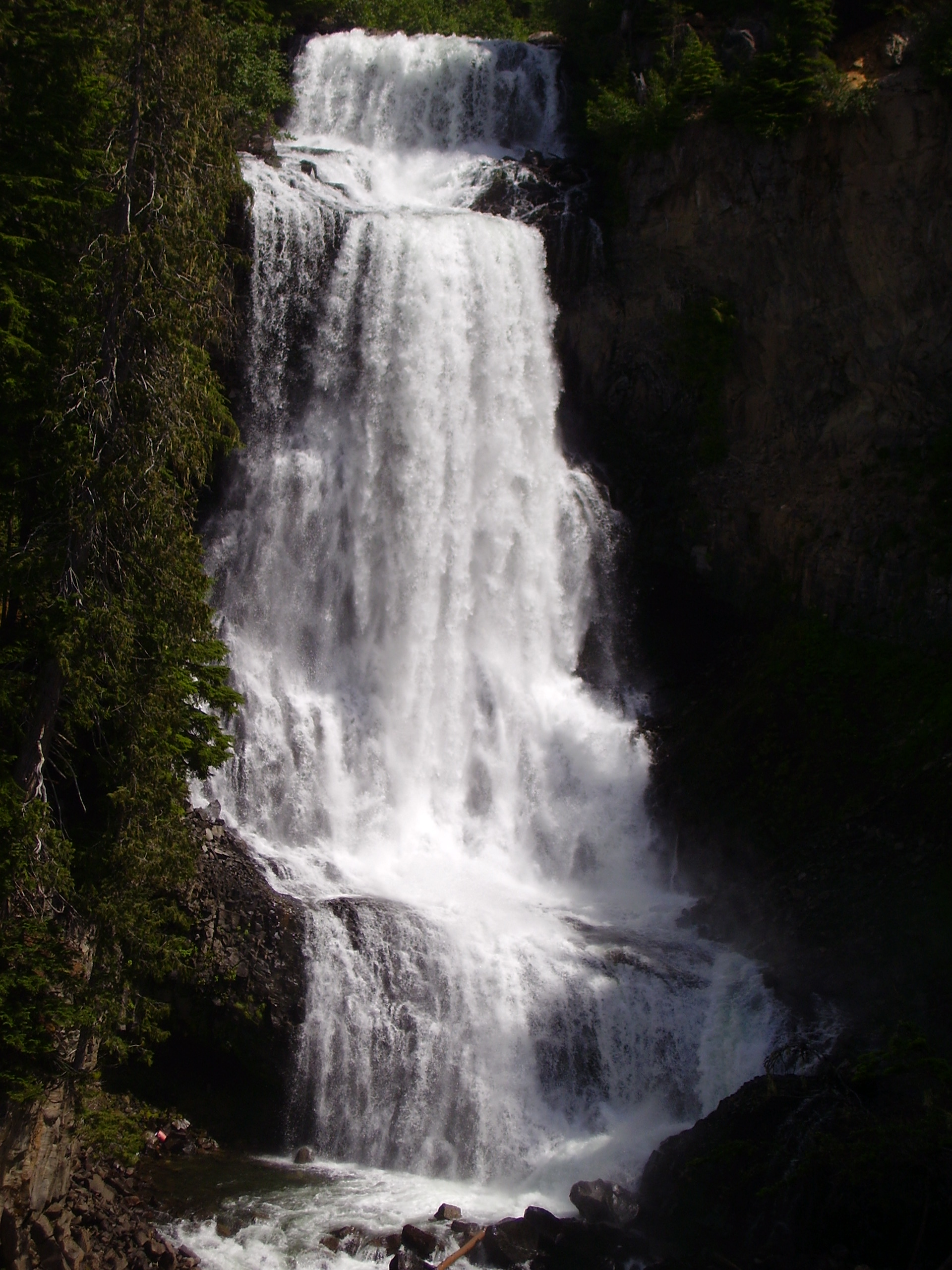
Alexander Falls

- Alexander Falls
- Ashlu Falls
- Aviron Bay Falls
- Bow Glacier Falls
- Crescent Falls
- Crooked Falls
- Cummins Falls
- Della Falls
- Fairy Creek Falls
- Flood Falls
- Fossil Falls
- Harmony Falls
- Helmet Falls
- Kerkeslin Falls
- Les Sept Chutes
- Michael Falls
- Moresby Falls
- Murchison Falls
- Nairn Falls
- Peach Creek Falls
- Petain Creek Falls
- Place Creek Falls
- Pyramid Falls
- Rattling Brook Falls
- Sideways Falls
- Silvertip Falls
- Whispering Falls

=== Czech Republic ===
- Pančavský vodopád

=== France ===
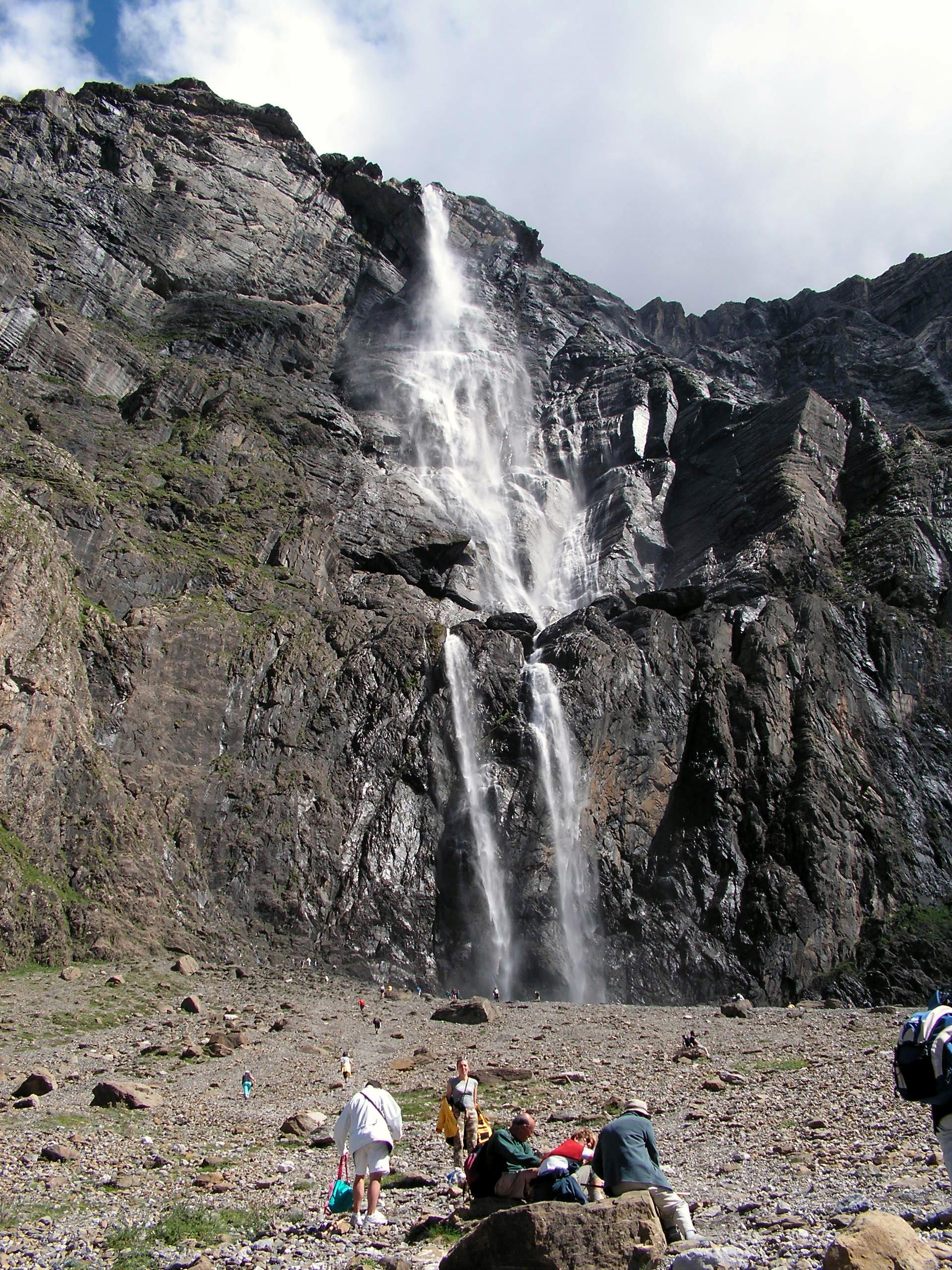
Gavarnie Falls

- Gavarnie Falls

=== Germany ===
- Röthbachfall

=== India ===
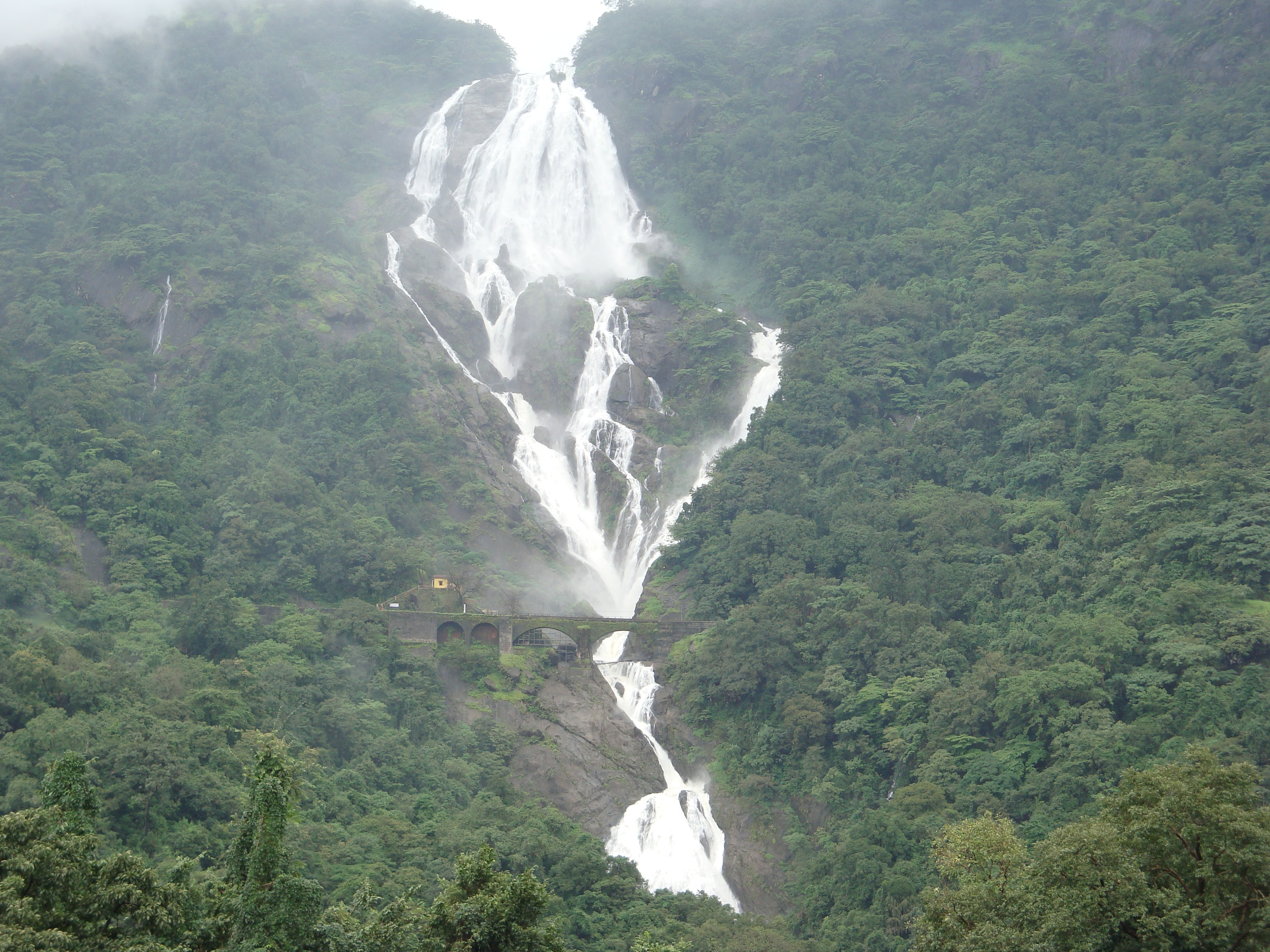
Dudhsagar Falls

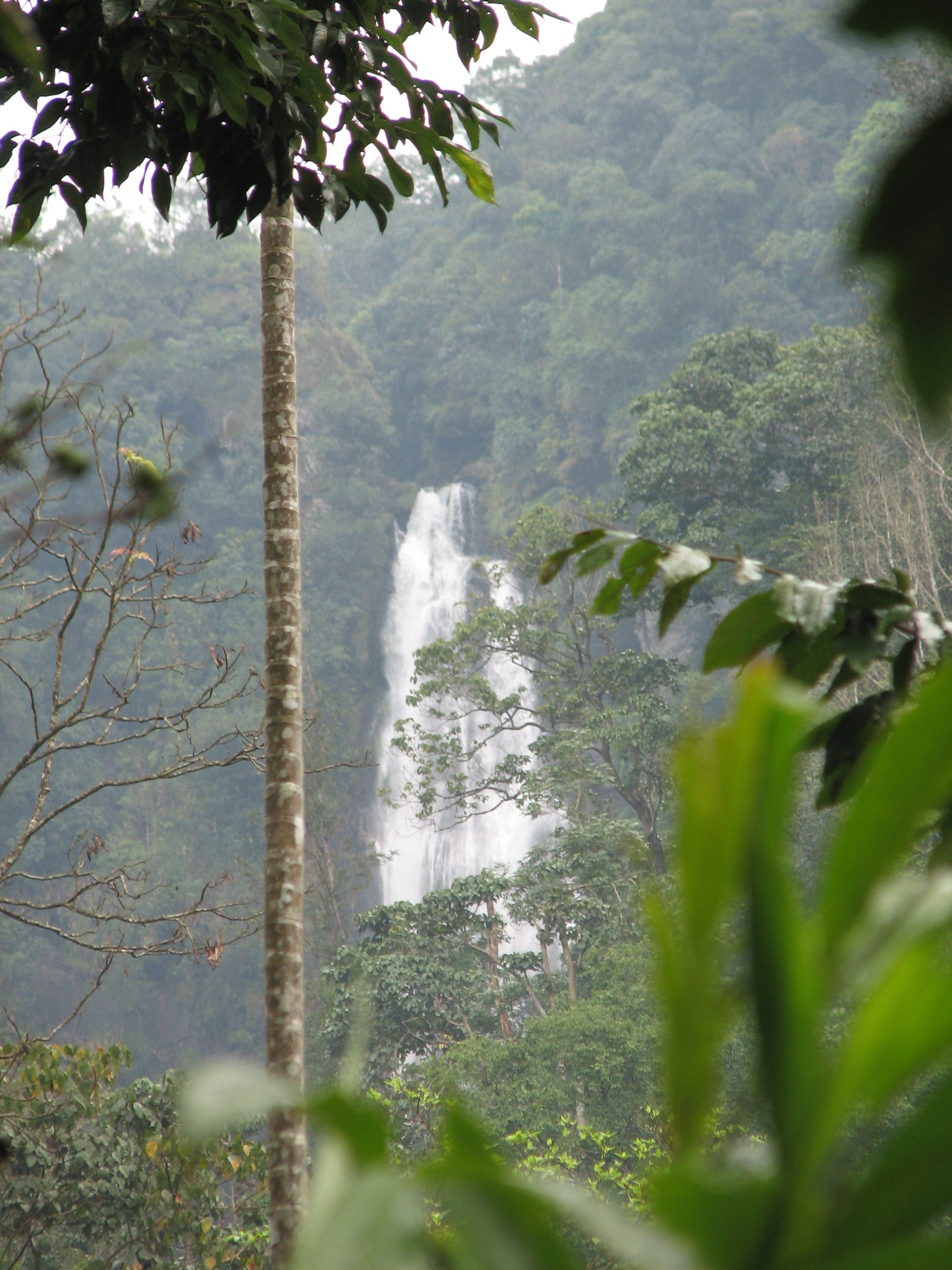
Hebbe Falls

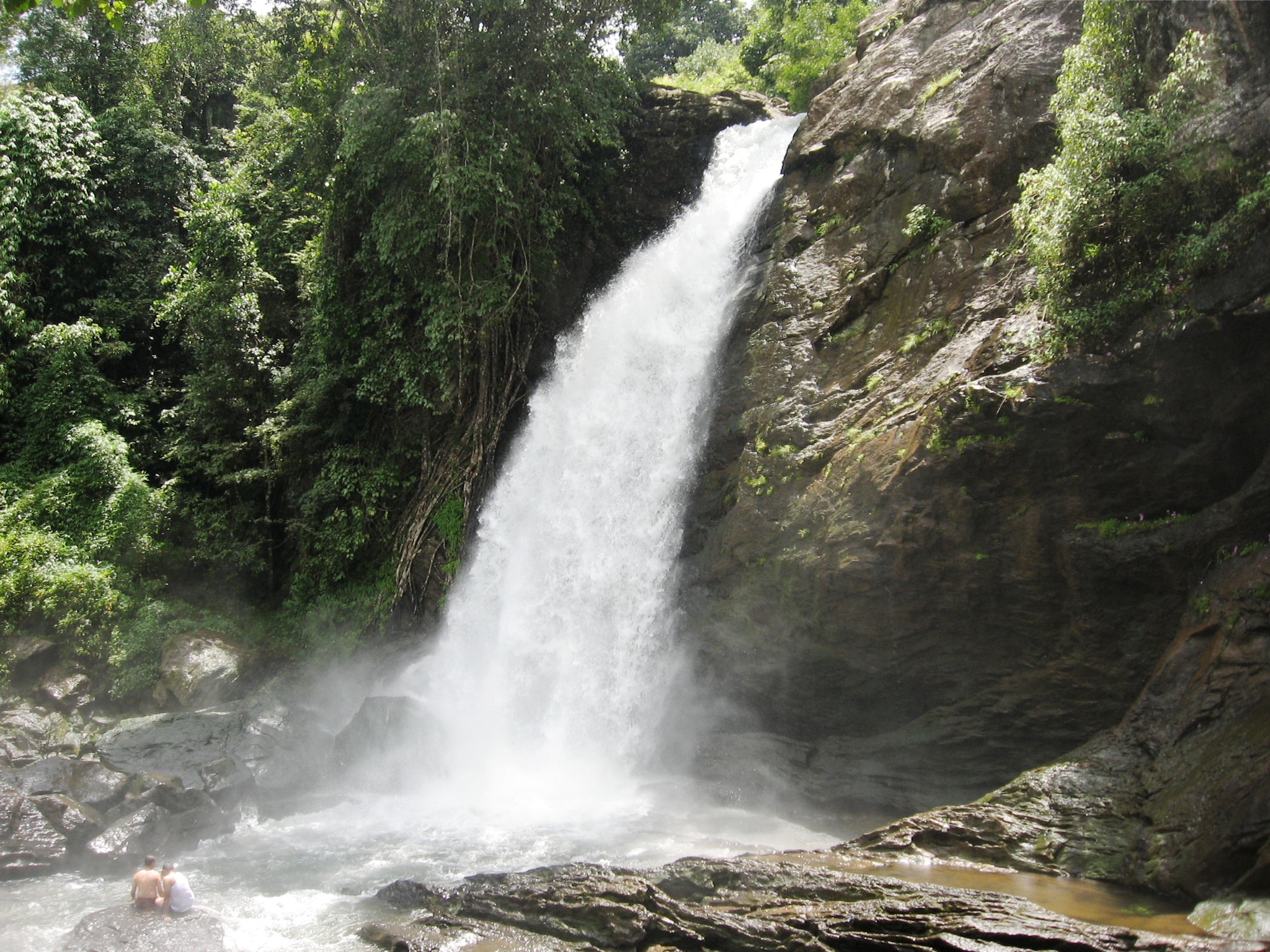
Soochipara Falls

- Barkana Falls
- Dudhsagar Falls
- Hebbe Falls
- Kunchikal Falls
- Soochipara Falls

=== Indonesia ===
- Parangloe Waterfall
- Tumpak Sewu Waterfalls

=== Italy ===
- Cascata delle Marmore
- Cascate del Serio

=== North Macedonia ===
- Roštuše Waterfall

=== Norway ===
- Langfossen
- Låtefossen
- Ramnefjellsfossen

=== Peru ===
- Gocta Cataracts
- Yumbilla falls

=== Sri Lanka ===
- Devon Falls
- Dunhinda Falls
- Ramboda Falls

=== Switzerland ===
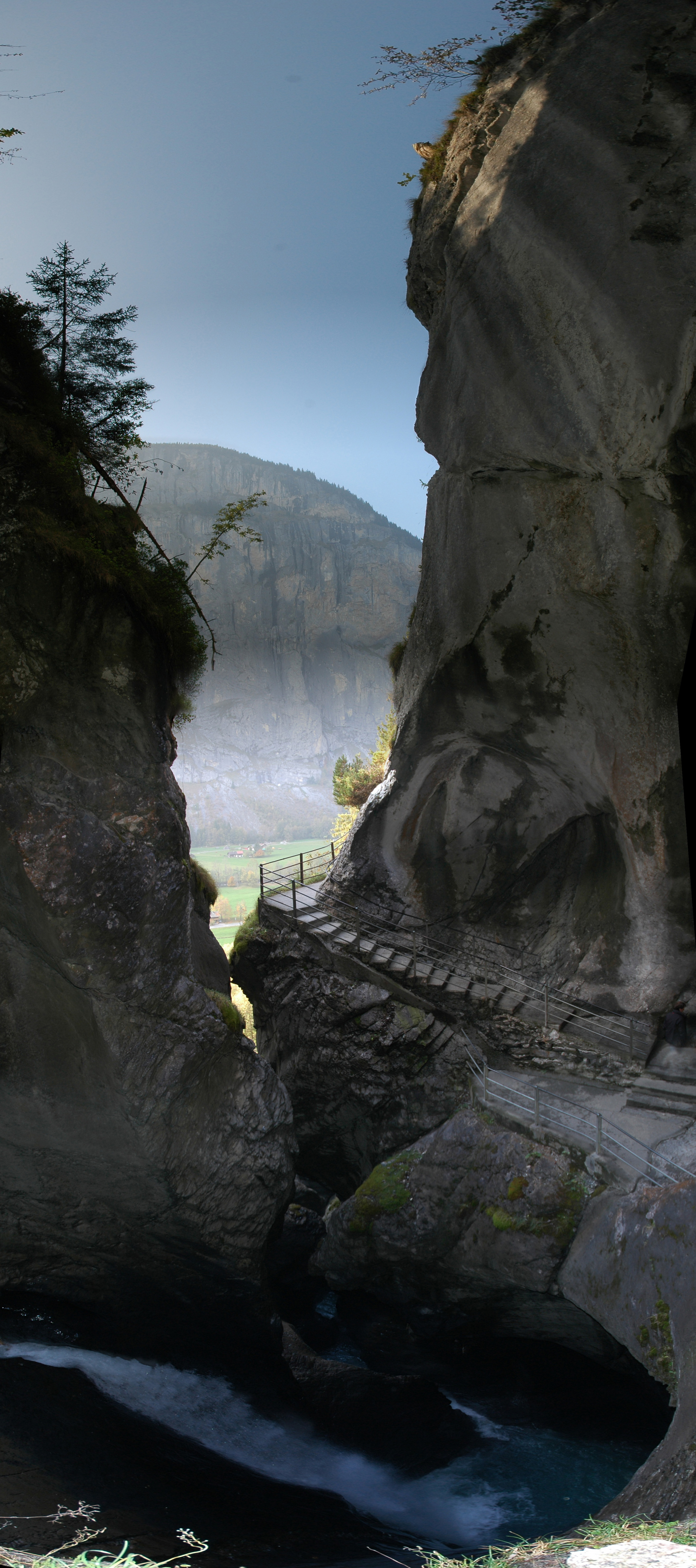
Trümmelbach Falls

- Engstligen Falls
- Trummelbach Falls

=== Thailand ===
- Kaeng Sopha
- Nang Rong

=== United Kingdom ===
- Aber Falls
- Aira Force
- Canonteign Falls
- Cautley Spout
- Dolgoch Falls
- Eas a' Chual Aluinn
- Falls of Foyers
- Grey Mare's Tail, Llanrwst, Conwy
- Moss Force
- Pistyll y Llyn
- Scale Force
- Steall Waterfall

=== United States ===
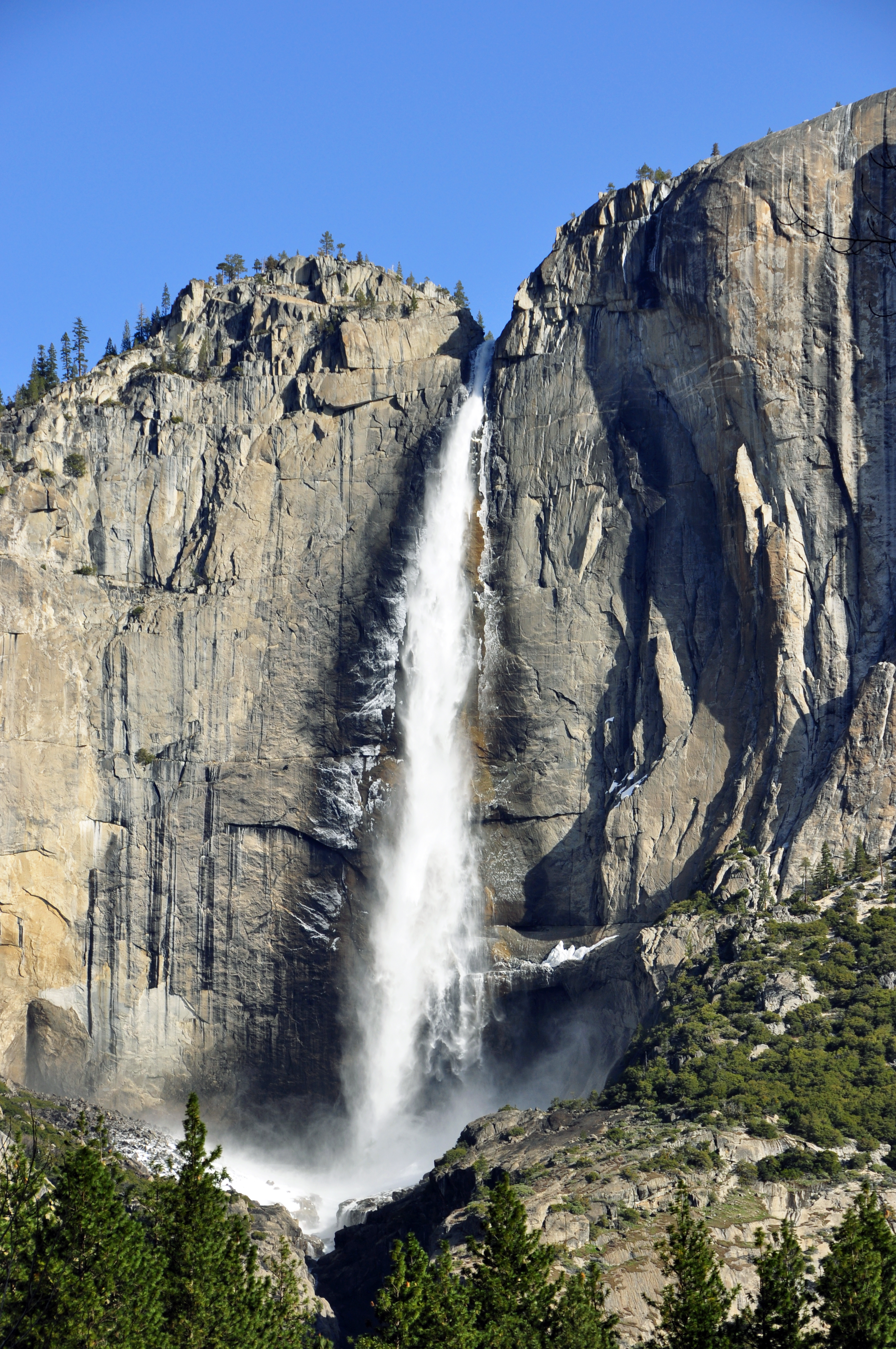
Yosemite Falls

- Amicalola Falls State Park
- Berdeen Falls
- Bonita Falls
- Bridal Veil Falls
- Calf Creek Falls
- Chilnualna Falls
- Comet Falls
- Eastatoe Falls
- Kaaterskill Falls
- Kahiwa Falls
- Linville Falls
- Mazama Falls
- Multnomah Falls
- Olo'upena Falls
- Rainy Lake Falls
- Seven Falls
- Silverthread Falls
- Sulphide Creek Falls
- Twister Falls
- Yosemite Falls
- Zapata Falls

== Punchbowl ==
Water descends in a constricted form and then spreads out in a wider pool.

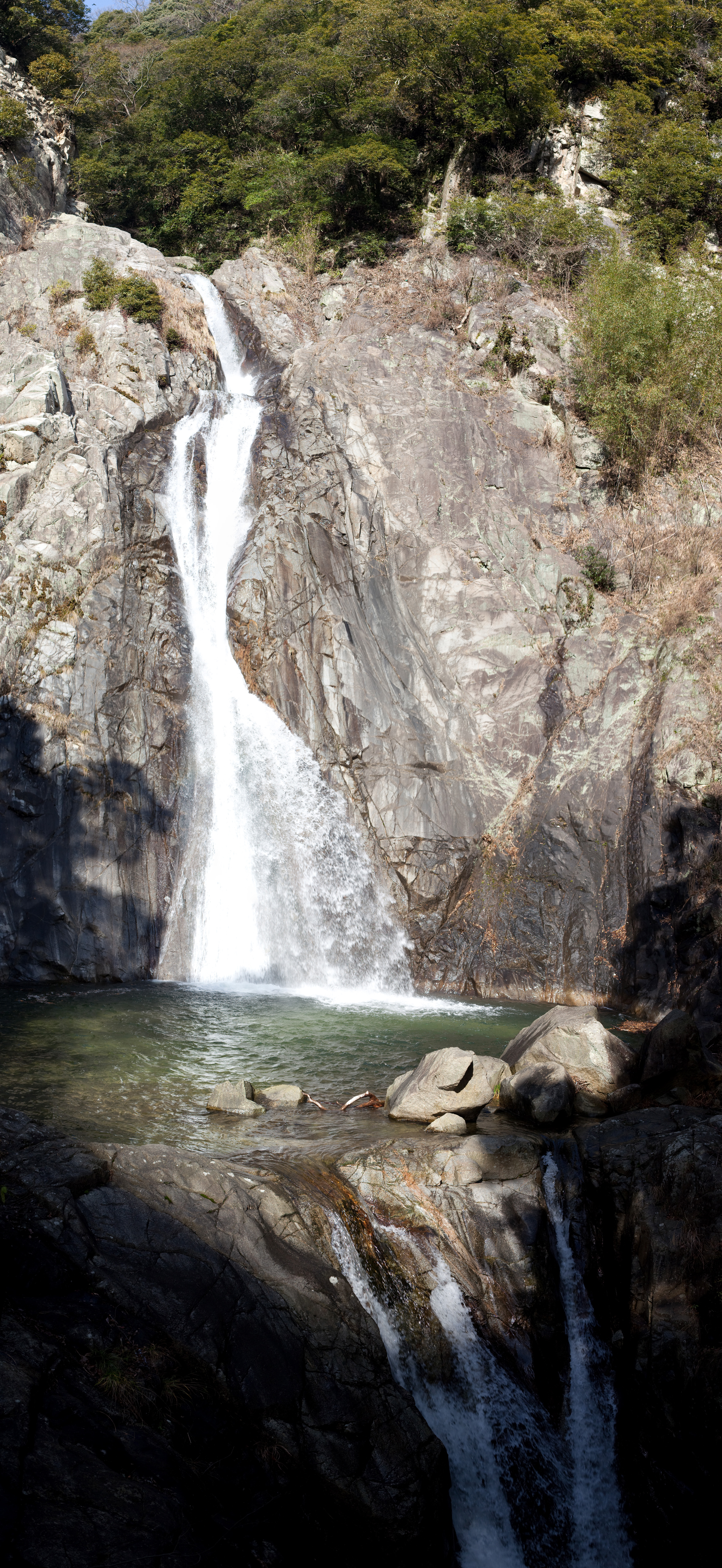
Nunobiki Falls

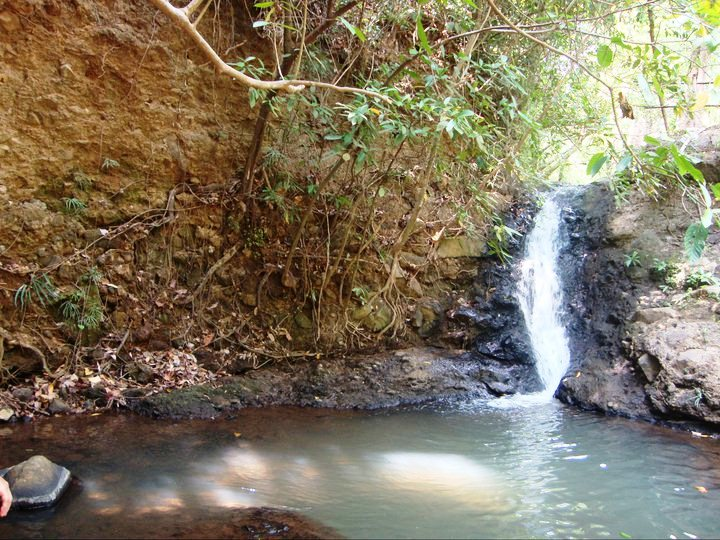
Camaya Falls

=== Australia ===
- Edith Falls
- Wangi Falls
- Wannon Falls

=== Bulgaria ===
- Emen Waterfall

=== Canada ===
- Keyhole Falls

=== Iceland ===
- Gjáin
- Hjálparfoss

=== Japan ===
- Nunobiki Falls

=== Korea ===
- Cheonjiyeon Waterfall
- Jeongbang Waterfall

=== Philippines ===
- Camaya Falls

=== United Kingdom ===
- Janet's Foss

=== United States ===
- Metlako Falls
- Punch Bowl Falls

== Fan ==
Water spreads horizontally as it descends while remaining in contact with bedrock.

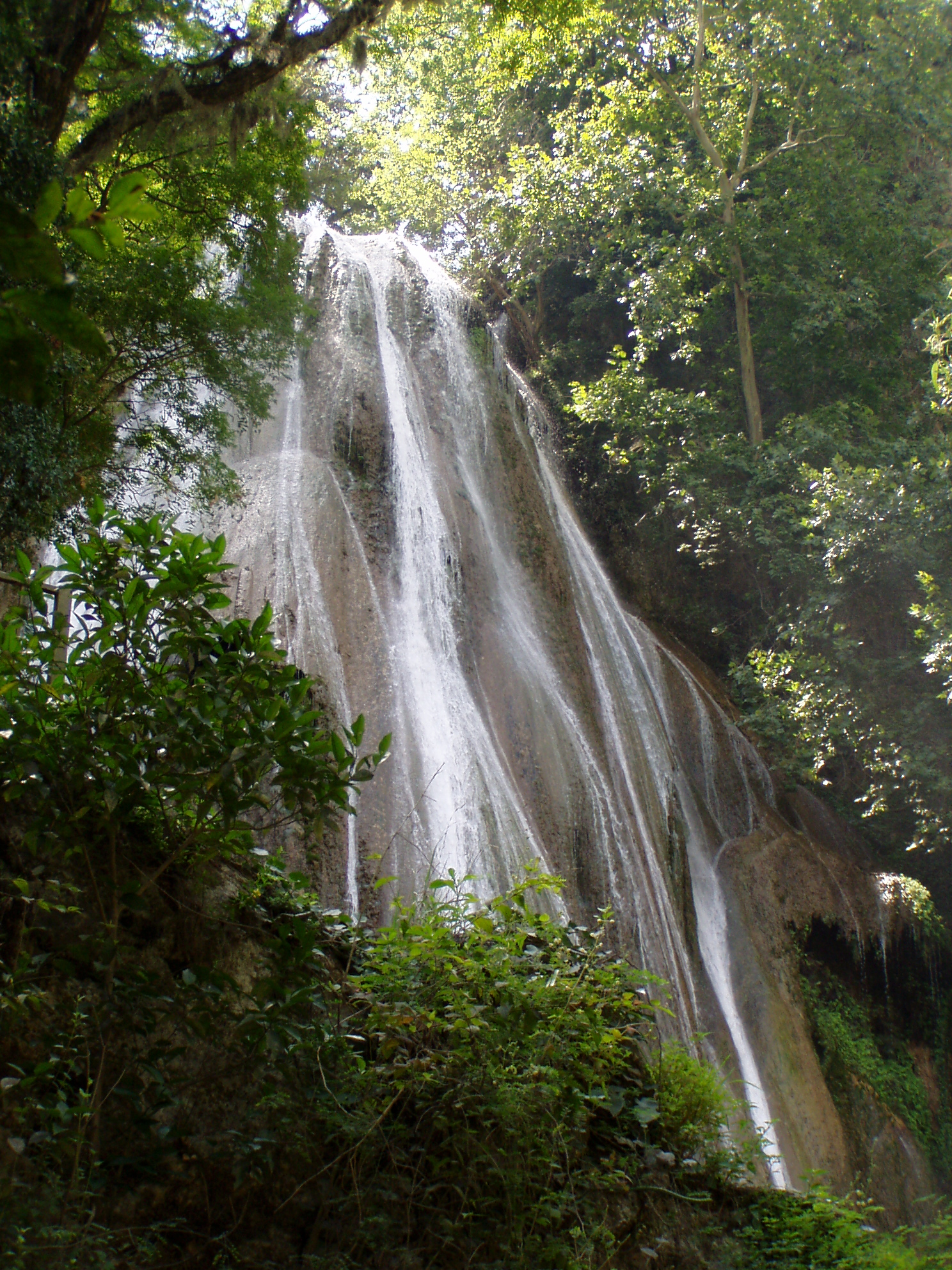
Cola de Caballo

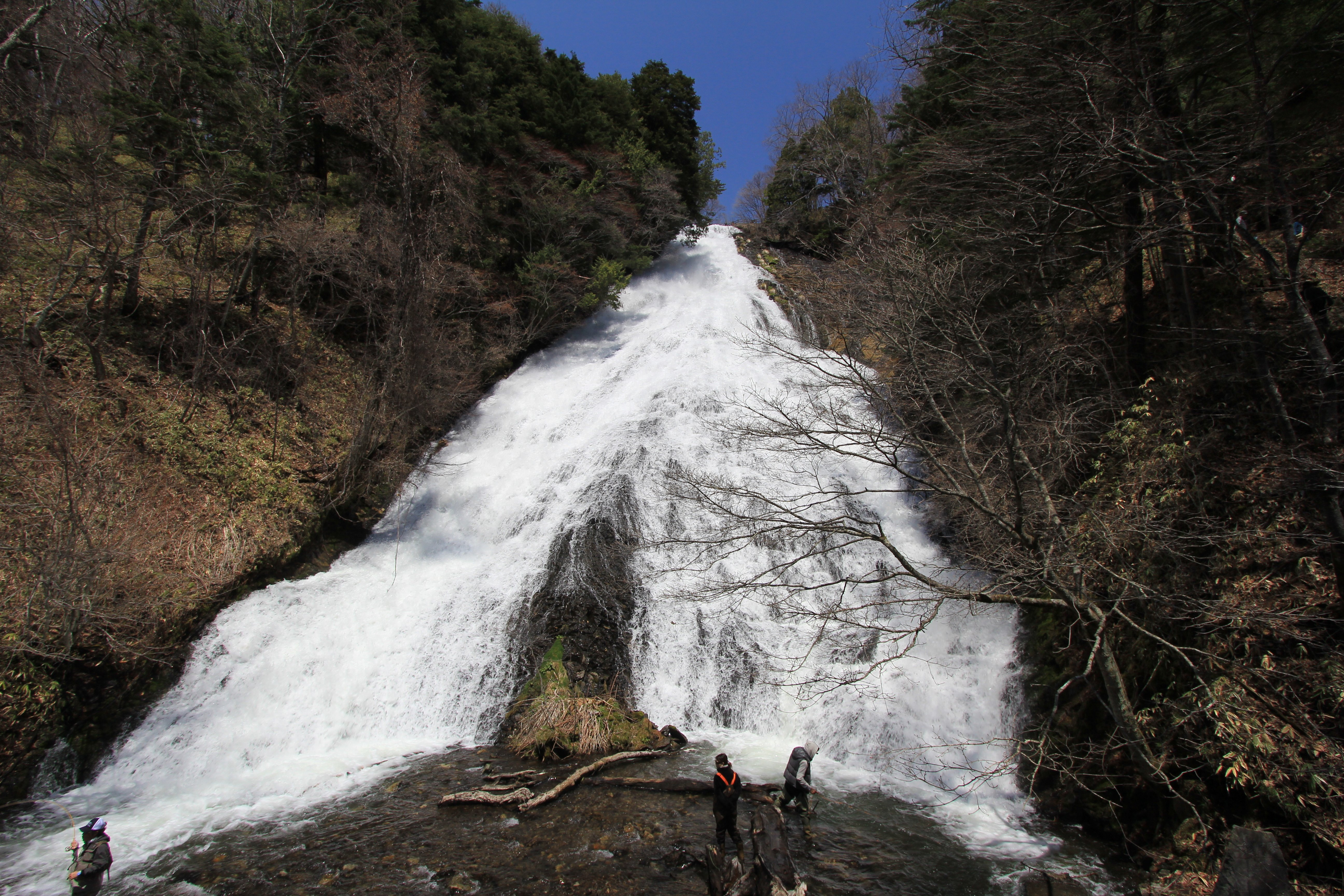
Yudaki Falls

=== Australia ===
- Dip Falls
- Nelson Falls

=== Canada ===
- Chatterbox Falls

=== Japan ===
- Yudaki Falls

=== Mexico ===
- Cola de Caballo

=== Philippines ===
- Tinago Falls

=== United States ===
- Falling Waters Falls
- High Falls
- Nugget Falls
- Turner Falls
- Union Falls

== Ephemeral ==
Ephemeral waterfalls flow only after periods of heavy rain or significant snowmelt.

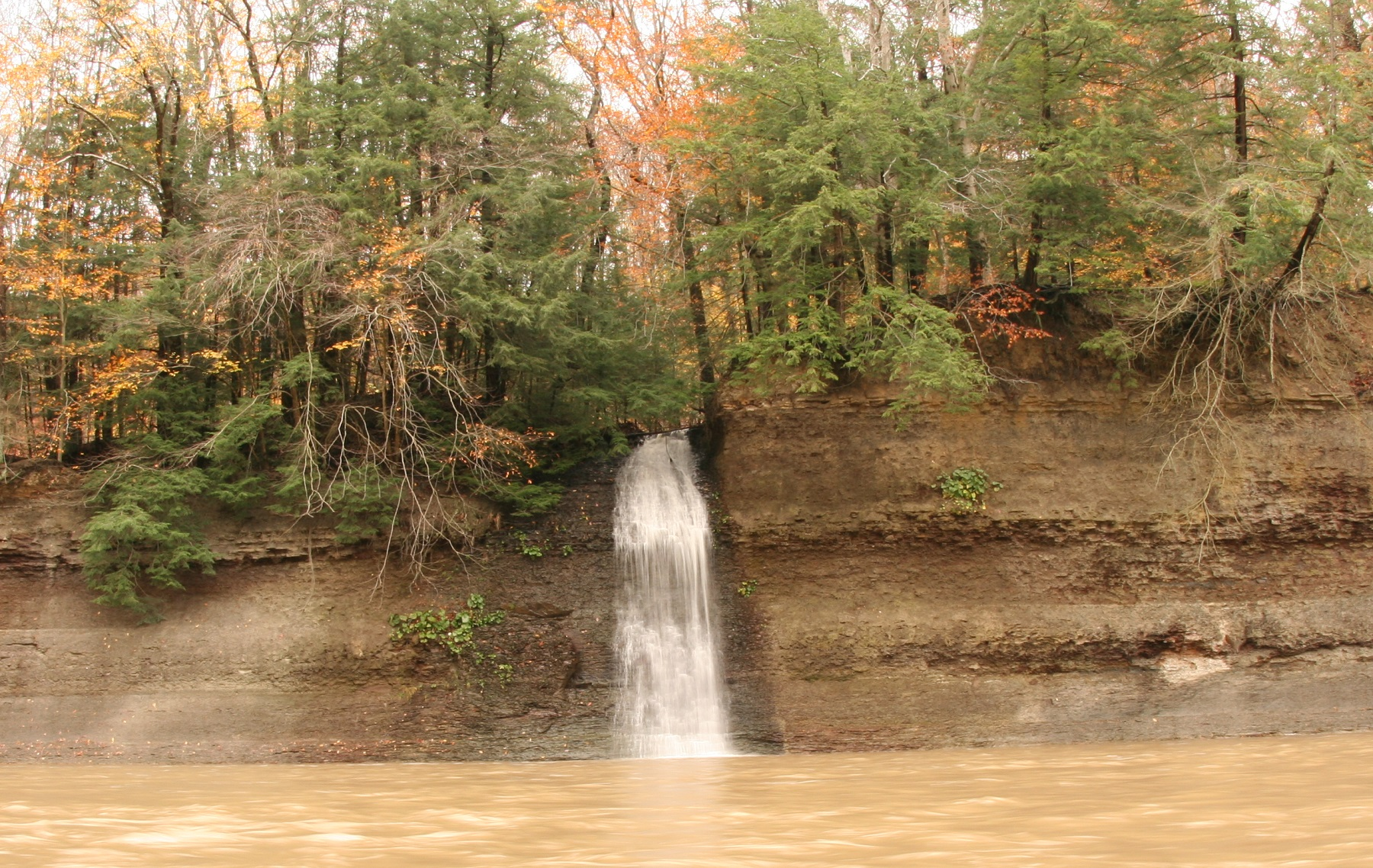
An example of an ephemeral waterfall. This one, when flowing, feeds into the Chagrin River (Ohio).

=== United States ===
- Horsetail Fall

=== Bulgaria ===
- Vrachanska Skaklya (141 m)

== See also ==
- Waterfall § Types
- List of waterfalls
- List of waterfalls by height
- List of waterfalls by flow rate
