= List of waterfalls in Nova Scotia =

This is a list of waterfalls in the Canadian province of Nova Scotia.

== List of waterfalls ==
Waterfalls of Nova Scotia

| Image | Waterfall | City / County | Watercourse | Drop | Width | Class | Type | Coordinates (Note: Except as noted, source is Mike Richard (May 30, 2019). "Waterfalls of Nova Scotia". MR Maps.) |
|---|---|---|---|---|---|---|---|---|
| | Acacia Trail Falls | Digby | | | | | | 44°32′34″N 65°46′11″W |
| | Ackers Brook Falls | Shelburne | | | | | | 43°45′06″N 65°23′23″W |
| | Adams Brook Falls | Cumberland | | | | | | 45°25′49″N 64°07′54″W |
| | Allains River Falls | Annapolis | | | | | | 44°41′27″N 65°29′37″W |
| | Allen Brook Falls | West Hants | | | | | | 44°59′11″N 64°15′24″W |
| | Andrews Brook lower Falls | Annapolis | | | | | | 45°01′42″N 65°05′16″W |
| | Andrews Falls | Annapolis | | | | | | 45°01′40″N 65°05′14″W |
| | Annandale Falls | Cumberland | | | | | | 45°37′08″N 63°29′56″W |
| | Anthony Aucoin Brook Falls | Inverness | | | | | | 46°42′20″N 60°54′59″W |
| | Apron Falls | Lunenburg | | | | | | 44°36′45″N 64°45′44″W |
| | Archibalds Brook Falls | St. Mary's | | | | | | 45°11′32″N 61°57′19″W |
| | Archies Falls | Queens | | | | | | 44°24′24″N 64°53′04″W |
| | Archway Falls | Inverness | | | | | | 45°46′48″N 61°13′21″W |
| | Arisaig Brook Falls | Antigonish | | | | | | 45°45′13″N 62°10′31″W |
| | Armstrong River Falls | West Hants | | | | | | 44°47′02″N 64°09′28″W |
| | Arrowhead Falls | Colchester | | | | | | 45°36′58″N 63°22′19″W |
| | Aucoin Brook Falls | Inverness | | | | | | 46°41′45″N 60°55′45″W |
| | Avon River Falls and dam | West Hants | | | | | | 44°51′59″N 64°14′14″W |
| | Bad Falls | | | | | | | 43°52′59″N 65°45′58″W |
| | Bad Falls | Yarmouth | | | | | | 44°01′05″N 65°48′58″W |
| | Bad Luck Falls | Halifax | | | | | | 44°40′29″N 63°41′02″W |
| | Bailey Brook Falls | West Hants | | | | | | 45°00′19″N 63°54′25″W |
| | Baker Falls | West Hants | | | | | | 44°53′56″N 64°19′25″W |
| | Balmoral Mills Falls | Colchester | | | | | | 45°38′43″N 63°11′43″W |
| | Bangs Falls | Queens | | | | | | 44°14′48″N 64°50′06″W |
| | Barachois River Falls | Victoria | | | | | | 46°21′54″N 60°35′42″W |
| | Barr Brook Falls | East Hants | | | | | | 45°08′03″N 63°37′35″W |
| | Barren Hill Falls | Richmond | | | | | | 45°42′19″N 60°36′24″W |
| | Barrio Falls | Clare | | | | | | 44°12′24″N 65°49′21″W |
| | Basin Falls | Shelburne | | | | | | 43°52′04″N 65°23′37″W |
| | Bass River Falls | Colchester | | | | | | 45°28′13″N 63°46′48″W |
| | Bass River Falls | Colchester | | | | | | 45°27′50″N 64°02′46″W |
| | Bass River Upper Falls | Colchester | | | | | | 45°28′27″N 64°02′52″W |
| | Baxters Harbour Falls | | | | | | | 43°52′01″N 65°23′56″W |
| | Baxters Harbour Falls | Kings | | | | | | 45°13′49″N 64°30′45″W |
| | Beal's Falls | Kings | | | | | | 44°58′45″N 64°47′24″W |
| | Bear Brook Falls | East Hants | | | | | | 45°17′13″N 63°48′15″W |
| | Bear Brook Falls | Kings | | | | | | 45°09′09″N 64°47′57″W |
| | Bear Brook Falls | Pictou | | | | | | 45°36′31″N 62°13′46″W |
| | Bear Falls | Queens | | | | | | 44°14′24″N 64°48′57″W |
| | Bear Trap Falls | Halifax | | | | | | 44°41′53″N 63°46′50″W |
| | Beaver Brook Falls | Colchester | | | | | | 45°26′34″N 63°58′12″W |
| | Beaver Brook Falls | Inverness | | | | | | 45°39′01″N 61°23′34″W |
| | Beaver River Falls | Pictou | | | | | | 45°31′23″N 62°10′29″W |
| | Beaverdam Brook Falls | Halifax | | | | | | 44°37′19″N 63°39′18″W |
| | Beechmont Falls | Cape Breton | | | | | | 46°02′47″N 60°26′06″W |
| | Beeswanger Brook Falls | East Hants | | | | | | 44°52′06″N 63°54′25″W |
| | Ben's Paradise Falls | Colchester | | | | | | 45°27′05″N 64°00′09″W |
| | Benacadie River Falls | Cape Breton | | | | | | 45°58′03″N 60°41′03″W |
| | Benbie Brook Falls | Pictou | | | | | | 45°32′00″N 62°52′55″W |
| | Benery Brook Falls | Halifax | | | | | | 44°53′50″N 63°32′36″W |
| | Bennery Brook Falls | Halifax | | | | | | 44°54′49″N 63°32′15″W |
| | Benoit Brook Twin Falls | Colchester | | | | | | 45°30′18″N 63°36′19″W |
| | Bentley Brook Falls | Colchester | | | | | | 45°15′50″N 63°02′07″W |
| | Benvie Brook Falls | Halifax | | | | | | 45°07′25″N 63°00′23″W |
| | Beulach Ban Falls | Victoria | | | | | | 46°48′49″N 60°37′31″W |
| | Bezansons Brook Falls | Pictou | | | | | | 45°31′43″N 63°00′11″W |
| | Big Bald Rock Brook Falls | Cumberland | | | | | | 45°21′20″N 64°56′11″W |
| | Big Cascade | | | | | | | 44°51′00″N 63°43′59″W |
| | Big Falls | | | | | | | 45°09′00″N 61°58′59″W |
| | Big Falls | | | | | | | 44°07′59″N 64°55′55″W |
| | Big Falls | | | | | | | 44°07′59″N 60°38′56″W |
| | Big Falls | | | | | | | 43°58′01″N 65°34′55″W |
| | Big Falls | | | | | | | 43°37′59″N 65°34′55″W |
| | Big Falls | Shelburne | | | | | | 43°53′56″N 65°14′41″W |
| | Big Lake Falls | Halifax | | | | | | 44°31′02″N 63°52′11″W |
| | Big Tumbling Falls | Lunenburg | | | | | | 44°29′42″N 64°53′25″W |
| | Bill Neds Brook Falls | St. Mary's | | | | | | 45°13′27″N 62°02′02″W |
| | Bishops Lake Falls | Richmond | | | | | | 45°43′03″N 60°42′12″W |
| | Black Beach Brook Falls | Victoria | | | | | | 46°46′39″N 60°19′54″W |
| | Black Brook Canyon Falls | Colchester | | | | | | 45°11′47″N 62°58′06″W |
| | Black Brook Falls | Halifax | | | | | | 44°55′33″N 63°29′56″W |
| | Black Brook Falls | Kings | | | | | | 45°15′05″N 64°26′36″W |
| | Black Brook Falls | St. Mary's | | | | | | 45°16′56″N 62°31′37″W |
| | Black Brook Falls | Victoria | | | | | | 46°07′20″N 60°58′39″W |
| | Black Brook Waterfall | Pictou | | | | | | 45°25′08″N 62°10′58″W |
| | Black Duck Run Falls | Halifax | | | | | | 44°31′02″N 63°52′12″W |
| | Black Hole Brook Falls | Kings | | | | | | 45°14′02″N 64°29′39″W |
| | Black Marsh Brook Falls | Chester | | | | | | 44°41′04″N 64°22′35″W |
| | Black River Falls | Annapolis | | | | | | 44°53′18″N 64°59′25″W |
| | Black River Falls | Halifax | | | | | | 44°55′05″N 63°29′37″W |
| | Blackie Brook Falls | Colchester | | | | | | 45°12′41″N 62°56′08″W |
| | Blanchard Brook Falls | Pictou | | | | | | 45°24′36″N 62°30′02″W |
| | Bloody Creek Falls | Annapolis | | | | | | 44°48′27″N 65°17′29″W |
| | Blue Falls | | | | | | | 44°48′00″N 63°09′58″W |
| | Blue Falls | Annapolis | | | | | | 44°57′40″N 65°12′26″W |
| | Blue Mills Falls | Inverness | | | | | | 45°55′41″N 61°14′03″W |
| | Blues Brook Falls | Inverness | | | | | | 45°56′01″N 61°11′55″W |
| | Blues Brook Tributary Falls | Inverness | | | | | | 45°56′09″N 61°12′51″W |
| | Blues Mill Falls | Inverness | | | | | | 45°55′41″N 61°14′01″W |
| | Bolyne Falls | Inverness | | | | | | 46°12′37″N 61°20′59″W |
| | Borden Brook Falls | Kings | | | | | | 45°15′40″N 64°21′23″W |
| | Bothan Brook Falls | Victoria | | | | | | 46°17′01″N 60°52′48″W |
| | Boudreau Brook Falls | Annapolis | | | | | | 44°42′10″N 65°44′54″W |
| | Bourinot Falls | Cape Breton | | | | | | 46°03′12″N 60°29′30″W |
| | Brierly Brook Falls | Antigonish | | | | | | 45°37′28″N 62°06′00″W |
| | Brierly Brook Falls | Antigonish | | | | | | 45°36′13″N 62°05′17″W |
| | Broad Falls | | | | | | | 44°31′01″N 63°38′56″W |
| | Broad River Falls | Queens | | | | | | 43°57′21″N 64°50′00″W |
| | Brook Falls | Annapolis | | | | | | 45°00′21″N 65°08′27″W |
| | Browning Brook Falls | Pictou | | | | | | 45°33′41″N 62°23′29″W |
| | Browns Brook Falls | Colchester | | | | | | 45°24′48″N 63°01′42″W |
| | Browns Brook Falls | Kings | | | | | | 45°06′10″N 64°51′47″W |
| | Brymer Brook Falls | Guysborough | | | | | | 45°29′00″N 61°33′02″W |
| | Buggy Hole Falls | Queens | | | | | | 44°14′10″N 64°48′15″W |
| | Bumpers Brook Falls | Cumberland | | | | | | 45°25′43″N 64°13′48″W |
| | Bumpers Brook Tributary Falls | Cumberland | | | | | | 45°25′44″N 64°14′13″W |
| | Bumpers Brpook Falls | Cumberland | | | | | | 45°25′42″N 64°13′47″W |
| | Burned Potato Falls | Lunenburg | | | | | | 44°39′00″N 64°25′55″W |
| | Burnside Falls | Colchester | | | | | | 45°18′03″N 62°58′20″W |
| | Burrills Falls | Argyle | | | | | | 44°08′38″N 65°50′46″W |
| | Butcher Hill Falls | Colchester | | | | | | 45°10′56″N 63°00′03″W |
| | Caldwell Brook Falls | Cumberland | | | | | | 45°36′56″N 63°35′49″W |
| | Callahan Gorge Falls | Antigonish | | | | | | 45°26′50″N 62°03′34″W |
| | Camerons Mountain Falls | Richmond | | | | | | 45°41′37″N 60°59′39″W |
| | Camp Carter Falls | Victoria | | | | | | 46°13′40″N 60°30′56″W |
| | Campbell Brook Falls | Inverness | | | | | | 46°02′11″N 61°28′29″W |
| | Campbells Falls | Queens | | | | | | 43°58′25″N 64°53′05″W |
| | Canaan River Falls | Chester | | | | | | 44°35′39″N 64°09′58″W |
| | Canada Creek Falls | Kings | | | | | | 45°10′04″N 64°44′36″W |
| | Cargill Brook Falls | Guysborough | | | | | | 45°15′33″N 61°58′06″W |
| | Carrying Falls | Shelburne | | | | | | 43°56′15″N 65°30′48″W |
| | Carter Falls | Colchester | | | | | | 45°17′44″N 63°14′14″W |
| | Carter Falls | Lunenburg | | | | | | 44°25′38″N 64°36′55″W |
| | Castlereagh Falls | Colchester | | | | | | 45°29′29″N 63°47′13″W |
| | Cavanagh Brook small Falls | Colchester | | | | | | 45°35′17″N 63°16′01″W |
| | Chain Lake Brook Falls | Colchester | | | | | | 45°29′22″N 63°54′57″W |
| | Chéticamp River Falls | Inverness | | | | | | 46°38′14″N 60°52′31″W |
| | Chéticamp Tributary Falls | Inverness | | | | | | 46°38′32″N 60°52′08″W |
| | Chéticamp tributary lower Falls | Inverness | | | | | | 46°38′17″N 60°52′12″W |
| | Chiganois River Tributary Falls | Colchester | | | | | | 45°30′21″N 63°19′54″W |
| | Chipman Brook Falls | Kings | | | | | | 45°10′41″N 64°39′29″W |
| | Chisholm Brook Falls | St. Mary's | | | | | | 45°16′17″N 62°24′24″W |
| | Chisolm Brook Falls | Inverness | | | | | | 45°49′20″N 61°26′38″W |
| | Chris Falls | | | | | | | 43°34′59″N 65°34′55″W |
| | Christie Brook Falls | Colchester | | | | | | 45°22′12″N 63°10′57″W |
| | Christie Hill Brook Falls | East Hants | | | | | | 44°51′40″N 63°54′26″W |
| | Churn Brook Falls | St. Mary's | | | | | | 45°14′59″N 62°09′07″W |
| | Clam Harbour River Falls | Guysborough | | | | | | 45°26′06″N 61°27′06″W |
| | Clementsport Falls | Annapolis | | | | | | 44°39′24″N 65°36′04″W |
| | Clysedale Falls | Antigonish | | | | | | 45°38′23″N 62°04′15″W |
| | Coal Brook Falls | Richmond | | | | | | 45°34′47″N 61°17′53″W |
| | Coal Mine Brook Falls | Colchester | | | | | | 45°30′08″N 63°17′32″W |
| | Cobbs Scutch Falls | | | | | | | 44°24′00″N 64°32′56″W |
| | Cobbs Scutch Falls | Barrington | | | | | | 43°53′54″N 65°30′23″W |
| | Coby Irving Brook Falls | Kings | | | | | | 45°13′57″N 64°29′57″W |
| | Cochran Falls | St. Mary's | | | | | | 45°13′40″N 62°00′39″W |
| | Coldstream Falls | Colchester | | | | | | 45°03′40″N 63°18′21″W |
| | Cooks Brook Falls | Halifax | | | | | | 45°02′58″N 63°15′39″W |
| | Cooks Falls | | | | | | | 43°54′00″N 65°30′58″W |
| | Cooks Falls | Bridgewater | | | | | | 44°24′03″N 64°32′47″W |
| | Corney Brook Falls | Inverness | | | | | | 46°43′15″N 60°53′37″W |
| | Cowie Falls | Queens | | | | | | 44°04′26″N 64°46′15″W |
| | Cranes Neck Falls | Shelburne | | | | | | 43°59′09″N 65°17′00″W |
| | Crooked Falls | St. Mary's | | | | | | 45°01′06″N 62°05′46″W |
| | Cross Brook Falls | St. Mary's | | | | | | 45°11′34″N 61°57′44″W |
| | Crystal Falls | Kings | | | | | | 44°56′16″N 64°52′42″W |
| | Curling Club Falls | Guysborough | | | | | | 45°26′42″N 61°30′03″W |
| | Cutie's Hollow Falls | Antigonish | | | | | | 45°37′33″N 62°09′03″W |
| | Darr's Falls | Lunenburg | | | | | | 44°26′16″N 64°35′14″W |
| | Dauphinee Brook Falls | Inverness | | | | | | 46°37′18″N 60°54′04″W |
| | Dauphinee Brook Lower Falls | Inverness | | | | | | 46°37′47″N 60°54′36″W |
| | Dauphinee Brook Upper Falls | Inverness | | | | | | 46°37′27″N 60°54′06″W |
| | Davidson Brook Falls | Cumberland | | | | | | 45°37′12″N 63°57′15″W |
| | Davidson Brook Lower Falls | Cumberland | | | | | | 45°26′00″N 64°19′24″W |
| | Davidson Brook Upper Falls | Cumberland | | | | | | 45°26′02″N 64°19′20″W |
| | Dawson Brook Falls | West Hants | | | | | | 44°55′27″N 63°58′46″W |
| | Dead Horse Brook Falls | Colchester | | | | | | 45°27′56″N 63°59′57″W |
| | Debert River Falls | Colchester | | | | | | 45°30′07″N 63°26′29″W |
| | Debert River mini gorge and mini Falls | Colchester | | | | | | 45°31′57″N 63°26′31″W |
| | Debert River Tributary Falls | Colchester | | | | | | 45°31′01″N 63°26′16″W |
| | Deep Lake Brook Falls | Halifax | | | | | | 44°42′31″N 64°07′08″W |
| | Delanceys Brook Falls | Annapolis | | | | | | 44°53′57″N 65°03′39″W |
| | Delaps Cove Falls | Annapolis | | | | | | 44°45′34″N 65°39′24″W |
| | Devils Hills Falls | Cape Breton | Devils Hill Brook | | | | | 45°58′41″N 60°01′44″W |
| | Dicks Meadows Brook Falls | Cumberland | | | | | | 45°33′12″N 63°33′01″W |
| | Digby Gut Falls | Digby | | | | | | 44°41′00″N 65°46′26″W |
| | Digby Neck Falls | Digby | | | | | | 44°30′40″N 66°02′55″W |
| | Doctors Brook Falls | Antigonish | | | | | | 45°43′26″N 62°08′11″W |
| | Dog Falls | Lunenburg | | | | | | 44°37′37″N 64°48′28″W |
| | Dollar Lake Falls | Halifax | | | | | | 44°56′30″N 63°17′18″W |
| | Donald's Falls | Colchester | | | | | | 45°32′38″N 63°05′37″W |
| | Dryers Brook Falls | Inverness | | | | | | 46°02′30″N 61°28′00″W |
| | Drysdale Falls | Colchester | | | | | | 45°38′09″N 63°15′04″W |
| | Dugald Brook Falls | Eskasoni 3 | | | | | | 45°59′16″N 60°34′28″W |
| | Dukeshires Lower Falls | Annapolis | | | | | | 44°29′04″N 65°13′09″W |
| | Dukeshires Upper Falls | Annapolis | | | | | | 44°29′11″N 65°13′52″W |
| | Duncan Brook Falls | Kings | | | | | | 45°03′33″N 64°19′22″W |
| | Duncanson Brook Falls | Kings | | | | | | 45°03′33″N 64°19′24″W |
| | Durkee Falls | Argyle | | | | | | 44°05′05″N 65°50′02″W |
| | Earltown Falls | Colchester | | | | | | 45°34′48″N 63°08′14″W |
| | East Branch Bass River Falls | Colchester | | | | | | 45°28′11″N 63°46′48″W |
| | East Branch Blues Brook Falls | Inverness | | | | | | 45°56′17″N 61°11′48″W |
| | East Branch Chiganois River Falls | Colchester | | | | | | 45°30′45″N 63°20′46″W |
| | East Branch Economy River Falls | Colchester | | | | | | 45°27′22″N 63°50′47″W |
| | East Branch Falls | Argyle | | | | | | 44°07′17″N 65°40′54″W |
| | East Branch Folly River Falls | Colchester | | | | | | 45°30′51″N 63°30′36″W |
| | East Branch French River Falls | Pictou | | | | | | 45°33′20″N 62°20′48″W |
| | East Branch Great Village River Falls | Cumberland | | | | | | 45°31′25″N 63°38′11″W |
| | East Ferry Falls | Digby | | | | | | 44°23′03″N 66°12′15″W |
| | East Moose River Falls | Cumberland | | | | | | 45°26′43″N 64°10′32″W |
| | East Noel River Falls | East Hants | | | | | | 45°17′40″N 63°41′43″W |
| | East River Falls | Chester | | | | | | 44°35′39″N 64°09′58″W |
| | East River Falls | Colchester | | | | | | 45°28′28″N 63°59′22″W |
| | East River Falls | Halifax | | | | | | 44°41′06″N 63°52′21″W |
| | East River Falls | Halifax | | | | | | 44°41′01″N 63°53′14″W |
| | East Sterling Brook Falls | East Hants | | | | | | 45°17′25″N 63°32′50″W |
| | Eel Weir Brook Falls | Annapolis | | | | | | 44°52′05″N 65°09′07″W |
| | Eel Weir Falls | | | | | | | 44°01′59″N 65°49′55″W |
| | Eel Weir Falls | | | | | | | 43°46′01″N 65°34′55″W |
| | Egypt Falls | Inverness | | | | | | 46°11′35″N 61°07′33″W |
| | Eight Mile Brook Falls | Pictou | | | | | | 45°36′08″N 62°55′39″W |
| | Elderkin Brook Falls | Kentville | | | | | | 45°03′30″N 64°28′44″W |
| | Elderkin Brook Falls | Kings | | | | | | 45°03′22″N 64°28′39″W |
| | Ells Brook Falls | Kings | | | | | | 45°16′44″N 64°23′01″W |
| | Englehutts Falls | Halifax | | | | | | 44°55′31″N 62°17′41″W |
| | Enoch Falls | Cape Breton | | | | | | 45°49′44″N 60°33′22″W |
| | Erinville Falls | Guysborough | | | | | | 45°23′37″N 61°45′57″W |
| | Factory Falls | Inverness | | | | | | 46°33′08″N 61°00′10″W |
| | Fairmont Ridge Falls | Antigonish | | | | | | 45°41′16″N 61°56′55″W |
| | Fairy Hole Falls | Victoria | | | | | | 46°20′38″N 60°26′07″W |
| | Fales River Falls | Kings | | | | | | 44°56′21″N 64°53′41″W |
| | Falls Brook Falls | Colchester | | | | | | 45°21′03″N 62°50′45″W |
| | Falls Brook Falls | Pictou | | | | | | 45°31′38″N 62°31′21″W |
| | Falls River Falls | West Hants | | | | | | 44°57′01″N 64°06′27″W |
| | Fallsng Brook Falls | Colchester | | | | | | 45°30′55″N 63°13′45″W |
| | Faribault Falls | Inverness | | | | | | 46°36′09″N 60°54′24″W |
| | Farm Brook Falls | Inverness | | | | | | 46°34′17″N 60°59′50″W |
| | Fash Brook Falls | Annapolis | | | | | | 44°51′58″N 65°19′33″W |
| | Fentons Brook Falls | Guysborough | | | | | | 45°14′32″N 61°47′50″W |
| | Fenwick Falls | Cumberland | | | | | | 45°46′26″N 64°11′01″W |
| | Findlay Brook Falls | Colchester | | | | | | 45°09′40″N 63°03′10″W |
| | First Falls | Halifax | | | | | | 44°48′37″N 62°53′01″W |
| | Fiset Brook Falls | Inverness | | | | | | 46°35′55″N 60°58′16″W |
| | Fiset Brook Lower Falls | Inverness | | | | | | 46°36′10″N 60°58′38″W |
| | Fiveslands Falls | Colchester | | | | | | 45°23′15″N 64°00′19″W |
| | Flat Falls | Clare | | | | | | 44°12′06″N 65°50′07″W |
| | Fleet Brook Falls | Annapolis | | | | | | 44°43′09″N 65°43′41″W |
| | Folly River Falls | Colchester | | | | | | 45°29′35″N 63°31′34″W |
| | Folly Station Falls | Colchester | | | | | | 45°31′33″N 63°33′01″W |
| | Foote Brook Falls | Kings | | | | | | 45°10′20″N 64°40′58″W |
| | Four Mile Brook Falls | Colchester | | | | | | 45°38′15″N 63°16′44″W |
| | Franks Falls | Argyle | | | | | | 43°58′31″N 65°49′06″W |
| | Fraser Brook Falls | Halifax | | | | | | 45°05′47″N 62°58′33″W |
| | Frideaux Falls | Lunenburg | | | | | | 44°26′15″N 64°35′13″W |
| | Fulton Brook Falls | Colchester | | | | | | 45°14′55″N 62°50′26″W |
| | Gairloch Brook Falls | Pictou | | | | | | 45°28′48″N 62°48′53″W |
| | Galena Falls | St. Mary's | | | | | | 45°15′10″N 62°07′01″W |
| | Gallant Brook Falls | Inverness | | | | | | 46°23′56″N 61°02′15″W |
| | Gamble Brook Falls | Colchester | | | | | | 45°29′12″N 63°43′31″W |
| | Garden of Eden Falls | Cumberland | | | | | | 45°27′25″N 64°07′12″W |
| | Garden of Eden Upper Falls | Cumberland | | | | | | 45°27′56″N 64°07′55″W |
| | Gaspereau Mountain Falls | Kings | | | | | | 45°03′20″N 64°19′27″W |
| | Gaspereaux Falls | | | | | | | 45°00′00″N 62°14′56″W |
| | Gavin Brook Falls | Cumberland | | | | | | 45°26′01″N 64°18′31″W |
| | George Fraser Brook Falls | Cumberland | | | | | | 45°24′13″N 64°40′49″W |
| | Gerrish Valley Falls | Colchester | | | | | | 45°29′03″N 63°59′58″W |
| | Gesner Point Falls | Cape Breton | | | | | | 46°01′14″N 60°07′33″W |
| | Ghost Falls | Antigonish | | | | | | 45°37′08″N 62°08′09″W |
| | Gibraltar Lake Brook Falls | Halifax | | | | | | 44°52′19″N 63°15′11″W |
| | Gibraltar Rock Trail Falls | Halifax | | | | | | 44°53′04″N 63°14′36″W |
| | Gillis Lake Falls | Cape Breton | | | | | | 46°02′59″N 60°23′34″W |
| | Givans Brook Falls | Kings | | | | | | 45°06′57″N 64°47′04″W |
| | Glasgow Brook Falls | Cumberland | | | | | | 45°26′52″N 64°26′52″W |
| | Glasgow Brook tributary Falls | Cumberland | | | | | | 45°26′53″N 64°26′54″W |
| | Gleason Brook Falls | Halifax | | | | | | 45°10′11″N 62°55′07″W |
| | Glen Brook Falls | East Hants | | | | | | 45°04′29″N 63°48′23″W |
| | Glen Brook Tributary Falls | Inverness | | | | | | 45°53′29″N 61°16′56″W |
| | Glen Logan small Falls | Inverness | | | | | | 45°59′02″N 61°02′13″W |
| | Glencoe Brook Falls | Pictou | | | | | | 45°25′07″N 62°32′59″W |
| | Glendale Falls | Inverness | | | | | | 45°50′30″N 61°17′57″W |
| | Glenora Falls | Inverness | | | | | | 46°06′42″N 61°21′54″W |
| | Glode Falls | | | | | | | 44°21′00″N 64°54′58″W |
| | Glode Falls | Queens | | | | | | 44°12′26″N 64°45′23″W |
| | Glodes Falls | | | | | | | 44°30′00″N 64°54′58″W |
| | Glovers Falls | | | | | | | 43°54′00″N 66°00′58″W |
| | Gold River Falls | Chester | | | | | | 44°43′08″N 64°26′51″W |
| | Golden Brook Falls | Halifax | | | | | | 44°52′24″N 63°37′54″W |
| | Good Hunting Brook Falls | St. Mary's | | | | | | 45°14′59″N 62°04′44″W |
| | Goose Cove Brook Falls | Victoria | | | | | | 46°16′04″N 60°40′00″W |
| | Goose Cove Brook Lower Falls | Victoria | | | | | | 46°15′58″N 60°38′42″W |
| | Graham Brook Falls | Pictou | | | | | | 45°32′19″N 62°51′59″W |
| | Grand Falls | | | | | | | 44°37′01″N 63°44′56″W |
| | Grand Greve Brook Falls | Richmond | | | | | | 45°38′18″N 60°50′43″W |
| | Grandfather Clock Falls | Colchester | | | | | | 45°29′57″N 63°31′45″W |
| | Granite Lake Falls | Digby | | | | | | 44°17′56″N 65°22′20″W |
| | Grant Brook Falls | Cumberland | | | | | | 45°24′34″N 64°39′46″W |
| | Gray's Hollow Falls | Victoria | | | | | | 46°53′23″N 60°33′15″W |
| | Great Falls | Cumberland | | | | | | 45°32′43″N 63°49′59″W |
| | Great Falls | Victoria | | | | | | 46°23′04″N 60°32′13″W |
| | Great Village River Bridge Falls | Colchester | | | | | | 45°29′28″N 63°36′48″W |
| | Great Village River Falls | Colchester | | | | | | 45°30′27″N 63°38′40″W |
| | Green Brook Falls | Pictou | | | | | | 45°25′21″N 62°12′14″W |
| | Greenfield Brook Falls | Colchester | | | | | | 45°21′42″N 63°04′33″W |
| | Greville River Falls | Cumberland | | | | | | 45°26′01″N 64°33′03″W |
| | Gridiron Falls | Yarmouth | | | | | | 43°57′31″N 65°52′11″W |
| | Gulf Brook Falls | East Hants | | | | | | 45°01′48″N 63°46′33″W |
| | Gullivers Cove Falls | Digby | | | | | | 44°36′43″N 65°55′00″W |
| | Gully Lake Brook Falls | Colchester | | | | | | 45°32′00″N 63°04′23″W |
| | Gundalow Brook Falls | Colchester | | | | | | 45°27′57″N 64°02′32″W |
| | Guzzle Falls | Queens | | | | | | 44°04′47″N 64°48′32″W |
| | Halfway Brook Falls | Victoria | | | | | | 46°48′25″N 60°20′55″W |
| | Halfway River Falls | Kings | | | | | | 45°00′41″N 64°19′26″W |
| | Hallett Brook Falls | Guysborough | | | | | | 45°15′37″N 61°47′42″W |
| | Halls Harbour Falls | Kings | | | | | | 45°12′01″N 64°36′33″W |
| | Halls Lake Brook Falls | West Hants | | | | | | 44°54′53″N 64°03′27″W |
| | Hammonds Brook Falls | Inverness | | | | | | 46°02′17″N 61°27′24″W |
| | Hanley Falls | Clare | | | | | | 44°10′20″N 65°51′19″W |
| | Hannah's Brook Falls | Cumberland | | | | | | 45°28′44″N 64°20′59″W |
| | Hannons Falls | Cumberland | | | | | | 45°45′34″N 63°48′59″W |
| | Harmony Weir Falls | Queens | | | | | | 44°24′13″N 65°04′36″W |
| | Harrington River Falls | Cumberland | | | | | | 45°27′42″N 64°07′05″W |
| | Hart Lake Brook Falls | Cumberland | | | | | | 45°34′29″N 63°33′00″W |
| | Hartley's Falls | Guysborough | | | | | | 45°35′00″N 61°23′37″W |
| | Hartlings Falls | Halifax | | | | | | 44°56′40″N 62°23′52″W |
| | Hartman Brook Falls | Halifax | | | | | | 44°51′09″N 62°59′34″W |
| | Harty Brook Falls | Cumberland | | | | | | 45°34′28″N 63°33′33″W |
| | Hatfield Falls | Cumberland | | | | | | 45°27′17″N 64°13′08″W |
| | Healy Brook Falls | Annapolis | | | | | | 44°57′58″N 65°12′51″W |
| | Hellgate Falls | Kings | | | | | | 45°02′47″N 64°24′31″W |
| | Hells Gate | | | | | | | 43°37′59″N 65°34′55″W |
| | Hemlock Falls | | | | | | | 44°34′01″N 64°19′59″W |
| | Hemlock Falls | | | | | | | 43°51′00″N 65°50′56″W |
| | Hemlock Island Falls | | | | | | | 43°52′01″N 65°21′58″W |
| | Hemlock ravine and Falls | Colchester | | | | | | 45°14′06″N 63°10′02″W |
| | Hennessey Brook Falls | Annapolis | | | | | | 44°39′22″N 65°34′42″W |
| | Henry Brook Falls | Cumberland | | | | | | 45°28′17″N 64°19′54″W |
| | Herbert River Falls | East Hants | | | | | | 45°01′16″N 63°48′25″W |
| | Heron Falls | Lunenburg | | | | | | 44°13′14″N 64°37′26″W |
| | Hidden Falls | Cumberland | | | | | | 45°26′09″N 64°15′12″W |
| | Hidden Lake Falls | Pictou | | | | | | 45°32′53″N 62°30′23″W |
| | Hidden Valley Falls | Kings | | | | | | 45°03′09″N 64°26′46″W |
| | Higgins Brook Falls | Cumberland | | | | | | 45°34′46″N 63°34′34″W |
| | Higgins Falls | Cumberland | | | | | | 45°32′52″N 63°36′39″W |
| | Hilden Ravine Falls | Colchester | | | | | | 45°19′09″N 63°16′45″W |
| | Hill Brook Falls | Colchester | | | | | | 45°23′36″N 63°51′32″W |
| | Hirtle Falls | Lunenburg | | | | | | 44°25′52″N 64°37′38″W |
| | Hobson Lake Falls | Halifax | | | | | | 44°41′42″N 63°42′40″W |
| | Hooper Brook Falls | Annapolis | | | | | | 44°47′22″N 65°22′04″W |
| | Hopewell Falls | Pictou | | | | | | 45°28′54″N 62°41′41″W |
| | Horse Brook Falls | Kings | | | | | | 45°15′22″N 64°25′47″W |
| | Horse Falls | | | | | | | 44°04′59″N 65°27′58″W |
| | Horse Pasture Brook Falls | Cumberland | | | | | | 45°34′49″N 63°33′10″W |
| | Horseshoe Turn Brook Falls | Antigonish | | | | | | 45°50′32″N 62°00′09″W |
| | Howell Brook Falls | Kings | | | | | | 45°05′16″N 64°58′22″W |
| | Humming Brook Falls | Cumberland | | | | | | 45°26′33″N 64°11′14″W |
| | Hurlbert Brook Falls | Antigonish | | | | | | 45°26′36″N 62°00′45″W |
| | Indian Brook Falls | | | | | | | 46°22′59″N 60°31′59″W |
| | Indian Brook Falls | Lunenburg | | | | | | 44°31′59″N 64°41′57″W |
| | Indian Falls | | | | | | | 44°16′01″N 65°16′59″W |
| | Indian Falls | | | | | | | 43°57′00″N 65°48′58″W |
| | Indian Falls | Clare | | | | | | 44°13′01″N 66°07′03″W |
| | Indian Falls | Lunenburg | | | | | | 44°35′29″N 64°36′18″W |
| | Ingonish River Tributary Falls | Victoria | | | | | | 46°36′56″N 60°26′44″W |
| | Irish Brook Falls | Cape Breton | | | | | | 45°51′30″N 60°10′49″W |
| | Irish Cove Road Falls | Richmond | | | | | | 45°48′39″N 60°39′59″W |
| | Isaacs Harbour Falls | Guysborough | | | | | | 45°12′22″N 61°40′27″W |
| | Island Falls | | | | | | | 44°24′00″N 64°52′55″W |
| | Island Falls | | | | | | | 44°10′59″N 64°41′56″W |
| | Island Falls | | | | | | | 43°34′59″N 65°34′55″W |
| | Island Falls | Colchester | | | | | | 45°30′19″N 63°31′47″W |
| | Jam Falls | Halifax | | | | | | 44°48′09″N 63°09′50″W |
| | James Falls | | | | | | | 44°40′01″N 64°45′58″W |
| | James River Falls | Antigonish | | | | | | 45°36′15″N 62°07′51″W |
| | Jane's Falls | Colchester | | | | | | 45°33′59″N 63°10′18″W |
| | Jeffers Brook Falls | Cumberland | | | | | | 45°27′47″N 64°19′49″W |
| | Johnson River Falls | Halifax | | | | | | 44°49′53″N 63°33′34″W |
| | Jordan Falls | Shelburne | | | | | | 43°53′55″N 65°14′50″W |
| | Joseph Howe Falls | Truro | | | | | | 45°21′09″N 63°16′13″W |
| | Jumping Brook Falls | Inverness | | | | | | 46°44′35″N 60°55′02″W |
| | Juniper Brook WaterFalls | Colchester | | | | | | 45°32′02″N 63°02′28″W |
| | Kayak Falls | Lunenburg | | | | | | 44°25′50″N 64°37′32″W |
| | Kearney Lake Falls | Halifax | | | | | | 44°42′17″N 63°42′09″W |
| | Keating Sand Beach Falls | Annapolis | | | | | | 44°58′25″N 65°12′46″W |
| | Keddy Falls | Lunenburg | | | | | | 44°27′23″N 64°36′38″W |
| | Kempt Shore Falls | West Hants | | | | | | 45°07′06″N 64°11′41″W |
| | Kempton Falls | Annapolis | | | | | | 44°28′28″N 65°11′54″W |
| | Kent Brook Falls | Halifax | | | | | | 45°07′31″N 63°03′07″W |
| | Kewstoke Brook Falls | Inverness | | | | | | 45°58′17″N 61°14′28″W |
| | Keys Brook Falls | Halifax | | | | | | 44°57′53″N 63°27′28″W |
| | Keys Brook lower Falls | Halifax | | | | | | 44°58′09″N 63°27′41″W |
| | Kings Brook Falls | Halifax | | | | | | 44°54′12″N 63°37′34″W |
| | Kirkers Falls | | | | | | | 44°55′01″N 62°19′55″W |
| | Kniffen Brook Falls | Annapolis | | | | | | 44°36′10″N 65°38′43″W |
| | Lake Lawson Falls | Chester | | | | | | 44°43′34″N 64°26′46″W |
| | Lake Pool Falls | | | | | | | 44°16′01″N 64°50′56″W |
| | Landing Strip Falls | Victoria | | | | | | 46°13′09″N 60°47′16″W |
| | Lantz Falls | Lunenburg | | | | | | 44°36′07″N 64°40′15″W |
| | Lavis Brook Falls | Inverness | | | | | | 46°24′31″N 60°58′13″W |
| | Lawlor Brook Falls | Guysborough | | | | | | 45°20′21″N 61°38′23″W |
| | Lawrence Brook Falls | Cumberland | | | | | | 45°31′52″N 64°12′24″W |
| | Lawrencetown Falls | Annapolis | | | | | | 44°51′54″N 65°08′59″W |
| | Lewis Brook Falls | Guysborough | | | | | | 45°15′26″N 61°49′07″W |
| | Liscomb Falls | St. Mary's | | | | | | 45°02′06″N 62°06′19″W |
| | Little Barren Falls | Victoria | | | | | | 46°13′53″N 60°47′49″W |
| | Little Beech Hill Falls | Shelburne | | | | | | 43°54′01″N 65°20′28″W |
| | Little Branch Stewiacke River Falls | Colchester | | | | | | 45°20′28″N 62°54′06″W |
| | Little Falls | | | | | | | 46°19′01″N 60°39′58″W |
| | Little Flat Falls | | | | | | | 44°00′00″N 65°54′58″W |
| | Little Meander River Falls | West Hants | | | | | | 44°59′48″N 63°56′18″W |
| | Little Pike Fire Brook Falls | Colchester | | | | | | 45°28′09″N 64°02′32″W |
| | Little River Falls | Halifax | | | | | | 44°58′10″N 63°08′46″W |
| | Little River Falls | Kings | | | | | | 44°59′26″N 64°28′29″W |
| | Little River Falls | Pictou | | | | | | 45°25′47″N 62°22′00″W |
| | Little River Tributary Falls | Victoria | | | | | | 46°26′31″N 60°30′00″W |
| | Little Salmon Falls | Queens | | | | | | 44°13′22″N 64°46′57″W |
| | Little Tumbling Falls | Queens | | | | | | 44°27′24″N 64°52′36″W |
| | Lochaber Falls | Antigonish | | | | | | 45°24′10″N 62°03′11″W |
| | Logans Glen Falls | Inverness | | | | | | 45°59′07″N 61°02′18″W |
| | Logganville Falls | Pictou | | | | | | 45°35′01″N 63°03′15″W |
| | Long Beach Rd Falls | Kings | | | | | | 45°12′53″N 64°32′30″W |
| | Long Falls | Barrington | | | | | | 43°33′23″N 65°41′59″W |
| | Long Lake Brook Falls | Colchester | | | | | | 45°31′27″N 63°30′30″W |
| | Longs Falls | Barrington | | | | | | 43°47′18″N 65°35′10″W |
| | Loon Lake Falls | Queens | | | | | | 44°19′16″N 65°11′03″W |
| | Lost Creek Falls | Halifax | | | | | | 44°50′50″N 63°39′44″W |
| | Lower Apron Falls | Lunenburg | | | | | | 44°36′33″N 64°45′48″W |
| | Lower Bass River Falls | Colchester | | | | | | 45°27′55″N 63°46′35″W |
| | Lower Blues Brook Falls | Inverness | | | | | | 45°55′52″N 61°11′49″W |
| | Lower East Moose River Falls | Cumberland | | | | | | 45°26′12″N 64°10′39″W |
| | Lower EBFR Falls | Colchester | | | | | | 45°29′51″N 63°31′40″W |
| | Lower Gunns Brook Falls | Victoria | | | | | | 46°13′35″N 60°30′56″W |
| | Lower Hurlbert Brook Falls | Antigonish | | | | | | 45°26′38″N 62°00′48″W |
| | Lower Lake Falls | Queens | | | | | | 44°09′27″N 64°58′38″W |
| | Lower Liscomb Falls | St. Mary's | | | | | | 45°00′48″N 62°05′50″W |
| | Lower Little Falls | Victoria | | | | | | 46°18′51″N 60°38′26″W |
| | Lower Long Falls | Clare | | | | | | 44°09′50″N 65°51′13″W |
| | Lower West Bear River Falls | Digby | | | | | | 44°33′53″N 65°38′12″W |
| | MacAskills Brook Falls | Inverness | | | | | | 45°56′42″N 61°09′24″W |
| | MacAskills Lower Falls | Inverness | | | | | | 45°56′56″N 61°09′45″W |
| | MacAskills Middle Falls | Inverness | | | | | | 45°56′57″N 61°09′46″W |
| | MacBeth Road Falls | Pictou | | | | | | 45°37′54″N 62°57′15″W |
| | MacCuish's Brook Falls | Cape Breton | | | | | | 45°49′09″N 60°34′38″W |
| | MacDonald Brook Falls | Pictou | | | | | | 45°22′56″N 62°33′15″W |
| | MacDonald Mill Falls | St. Mary's | | | | | | 45°15′37″N 62°15′41″W |
| | MacInnis Brook Falls | East Hants | | | | | | 45°05′05″N 63°47′09″W |
| | MacIntosh Brook Falls | Inverness | | | | | | 46°48′24″N 60°45′33″W |
| | MacIsaac Brook Falls | Cape Breton | | | | | | 45°55′24″N 60°24′18″W |
| | MacKay Brook Falls | Pictou | | | | | | 45°37′20″N 62°58′17″W |
| | MacKays Mill Falls | Colchester | | | | | | 45°34′45″N 63°08′16″W |
| | Mackenzie Upper and Lower Falls | Inverness | | | | | | 46°45′12″N 60°47′21″W |
| | MacKillops Brook Falls | Richmond | | | | | | 45°41′28″N 60°37′04″W |
| | MacLellan Mountain Falls | Colchester | | | | | | 45°26′56″N 63°54′01″W |
| | MacLennans Falls | Victoria | | | | | | 46°16′14″N 60°27′42″W |
| | MacLeods Falls | Queens | | | | | | 44°09′55″N 64°39′27″W |
| | MacMullin Brook Falls | Cape Breton | | | | | | 45°59′56″N 60°33′25″W |
| | MacQueen Brook Falls | Victoria | | | | | | 46°26′05″N 60°29′43″W |
| | MacRae Brook Falls | Inverness | | | | | | 46°12′50″N 60°59′52″W |
| | MacRae Brook Falls | Victoria | | | | | | 46°11′07″N 60°56′54″W |
| | MacSween Brook Falls | Inverness | | | | | | 46°01′14″N 61°05′11″W |
| | Malay Falls | Halifax | | | | | | 44°59′48″N 62°29′02″W |
| | Maple Brook Falls | Inverness | | | | | | 45°48′29″N 61°17′56″W |
| | Maple Brook Falls | Pictou | | | | | | 45°24′24″N 62°39′09″W |
| | Margeretsville Falls | Annapolis | | | | | | 45°02′55″N 65°03′30″W |
| | Marshall Falls | Halifax | | | | | | 45°03′22″N 62°30′26″W |
| | Martha Brook Falls | Inverness | | | | | | 46°23′02″N 60°53′27″W |
| | Martin Brook Falls | Colchester | | | | | | 45°28′46″N 63°38′20″W |
| | Mary Ann Falls | Victoria | | | | | | 46°45′40″N 60°21′47″W |
| | Mason Falls | Halifax | | | | | | 44°51′09″N 62°43′40″W |
| | Matheson brook Falls | Colchester | | | | | | 45°28′41″N 63°41′12″W |
| | Matheson tributary Falls | Colchester | | | | | | 45°28′32″N 63°41′07″W |
| | McAdam Brook Falls | Antigonish | | | | | | 45°44′27″N 62°11′36″W |
| | McAlese Brook Falls | Cumberland | | | | | | 45°26′09″N 64°15′12″W |
| | McCallum Gulch Falls | Cumberland | | | | | | 45°26′23″N 64°09′39″W |
| | McCarthy Gulch Falls | Cumberland | | | | | | 45°26′44″N 64°08′11″W |
| | McCullough Brook Falls | Colchester | | | | | | 45°09′16″N 63°04′54″W |
| | McGrath's Mountain Falls | Pictou | | | | | | 45°33′05″N 62°21′03″W |
| | McIver Brook Falls | Victoria | | | | | | 46°01′46″N 60°59′11″W |
| | McKay Brook Falls | Pictou | | | | | | 45°39′55″N 63°05′22″W |
| | McKenzie Brook Falls | Inverness | | | | | | 46°09′34″N 61°01′10″W |
| | McKinnons Brook Falls | Richmond | | | | | | 45°39′59″N 60°48′21″W |
| | McLellan's Brook Falls | Pictou | | | | | | 45°30′39″N 62°35′39″W |
| | McLennan Brook Falls | Inverness | | | | | | 45°50′55″N 61°17′16″W |
| | McLeods Brook Falls | Kings | | | | | | 45°12′51″N 64°33′32″W |
| | McNabb Brook Falls | Antigonish | | | | | | 45°25′03″N 62°02′31″W |
| | McNeily Brook Falls | Annapolis | | | | | | 45°01′44″N 65°05′10″W |
| | McNutt Brook Falls | Colchester | | | | | | 45°20′35″N 63°21′51″W |
| | Meander River Falls | East Hants | | | | | | 44°57′35″N 63°51′53″W |
| | Meander River Falls | West Hants | | | | | | 44°59′48″N 63°53′54″W |
| | Meekin Brook Falls | Kings | | | | | | 45°07′00″N 64°50′59″W |
| | Meguma Falls | Colchester | | | | | | 45°32′08″N 63°04′17″W |
| | Mersey River Falls | Annapolis | | | | | | 44°29′06″N 65°13′07″W |
| | Meteghan River Lower Falls | Clare | | | | | | 44°13′03″N 66°07′12″W |
| | Meteghan River Upper Falls | Clare | | | | | | 44°12′52″N 66°06′39″W |
| | Middle Branch North River Falls | Colchester | | | | | | 45°32′48″N 63°14′12″W |
| | Middle Branch North River Falls | Victoria | | | | | | 46°22′16″N 60°45′04″W |
| | Middle River Falls | Pictou | | | | | | 45°31′56″N 62°14′41″W |
| | Middle Rockland Brook Falls | Colchester | | | | | | 45°31′49″N 63°36′04″W |
| | Middle Rockland Brook Falls | Cumberland | | | | | | 45°32′06″N 63°36′09″W |
| | Mill Bridge Brook Falls | Kings | | | | | | 45°13′25″N 64°31′36″W |
| | Mill Brook Falls | Chester | | | | | | 44°39′06″N 64°05′18″W |
| | Mill Brook Falls | Colchester | | | | | | 45°19′53″N 63°23′38″W |
| | Mill Brook Falls | Halifax | | | | | | 44°53′10″N 63°01′17″W |
| | Mill Cove Falls | Annapolis | | | | | | 44°42′03″N 65°45′00″W |
| | Mill Falls | Annapolis | | | | | | 44°26′20″N 65°12′54″W |
| | Mill Pool Falls | Queens | | | | | | 44°16′12″N 64°50′27″W |
| | Millbrook Road Falls | Pictou | | | | | | 45°30′40″N 62°48′37″W |
| | Miller Lake Falls | Halifax | | | | | | 44°49′34″N 63°35′06″W |
| | Millet Falls | West Hants | | | | | | 44°50′41″N 64°15′10″W |
| | Milton Falls | Queens | | | | | | 44°03′37″N 64°45′13″W |
| | Minister Brook Falls | Guysborough | | | | | | 45°22′04″N 61°39′24″W |
| | Mitchell Brook Falls | Pictou | | | | | | 45°23′05″N 62°12′54″W |
| | Monastery Brook Falls | Antigonish | | | | | | 45°34′30″N 61°38′59″W |
| | Monroe Brook Falls | Colchester | | | | | | 45°35′42″N 63°19′41″W |
| | Moodys Falls | Yarmouth | | | | | | 43°59′28″N 65°48′57″W |
| | Moores Brook Falls | Kings | | | | | | 45°03′00″N 64°30′26″W |
| | Moose River Falls | Annapolis | | | | | | 44°37′45″N 65°33′47″W |
| | Morar Brook Falls | Antigonish | | | | | | 45°51′11″N 61°59′33″W |
| | Morden Falls | Kings | | | | | | 45°06′16″N 64°56′03″W |
| | Morgan Falls | Lunenburg | | | | | | 44°32′03″N 64°42′44″W |
| | Morris Lake Brook Falls | Halifax | | | | | | 44°37′28″N 63°27′02″W |
| | Morris Lake Falls | Halifax | | | | | | 44°39′25″N 63°30′25″W |
| | Morrison Road Falls | Richmond | | | | | | 45°41′33″N 60°58′38″W |
| | Moser River Falls | Halifax | | | | | | 45°01′16″N 62°17′09″W |
| | Mosher Brook Falls | Annapolis | | | | | | 45°00′46″N 65°07′34″W |
| | Mosher Falls | Gold River 21 | | | | | | 44°33′54″N 64°20′56″W |
| | Mount Rose Falls | Annapolis | | | | | | 44°55′34″N 65°15′40″W |
| | Mt Pleasant Brook Falls | Inverness | | | | | | 46°12′46″N 61°04′45″W |
| | Mud Lake Brook Falls | Annapolis | | | | | | 44°51′59″N 65°09′28″W |
| | Mulgrave Falls | Guysborough | | | | | | 45°38′05″N 61°26′21″W |
| | Munroe's Brook Falls | Victoria | | | | | | 46°15′25″N 60°32′54″W |
| | Murray Brook Falls | Colchester | | | | | | 45°22′07″N 63°12′42″W |
| | Murray Brook Falls | Mulgrave | | | | | | 45°36′36″N 61°23′33″W |
| | Myles Doyles Falls | Inverness | | | | | | 45°51′53″N 61°16′26″W |
| | Nealy Brook Falls | Annapolis | | | | | | 44°59′37″N 65°07′52″W |
| | Nealy Brook Falls | Annapolis | | | | | | 44°59′30″N 65°07′38″W |
| | Neil's Harbour Falls | Victoria | | | | | | 46°48′25″N 60°20′55″W |
| | Nelson's Falls | Barrington | | | | | | 43°37′15″N 65°28′33″W |
| | New France Falls | Antigonish | | | | | | 45°34′27″N 61°43′45″W |
| | New Harris Falls | Victoria | | | | | | 46°13′38″N 60°31′21″W |
| | New Prospect Brook west tributary Falls | Cumberland | | | | | | 45°26′02″N 64°16′21″W |
| | New Prospect Falls | Cumberland | | | | | | 45°25′58″N 64°16′58″W |
| | Newton Brook Falls | Colchester | | | | | | 45°27′21″N 63°55′14″W |
| | Nichols Lake Falls | Halifax | | | | | | 44°34′44″N 63°43′40″W |
| | Nickersons Falls | Yarmouth | | | | | | 43°53′49″N 65°59′35″W |
| | Nictaux Dam Falls | Annapolis | | | | | | 44°51′14″N 65°01′41″W |
| | Nictaux Falls | Annapolis | | | | | | 44°54′30″N 65°01′51″W |
| | Nictaux River Falls | Annapolis | | | | | | 44°54′31″N 65°01′50″W |
| | Nictaux upper Falls | Annapolis | | | | | | 44°51′14″N 65°01′42″W |
| | Nile Brook Falls | Inverness | | | | | | 46°21′41″N 60°54′14″W |
| | Nine Partner's Falls | Yarmouth | | | | | | 44°00′26″N 65°55′25″W |
| | Noel River Falls | East Hants | | | | | | 45°17′12″N 63°44′13″W |
| | North Branch Musquodoboit River Falls | Halifax | | | | | | 45°10′41″N 62°52′58″W |
| | North Framboise River Falls | Richmond | | | | | | 45°44′32″N 60°24′27″W |
| | North River Falls | Colchester | | | | | | 45°26′05″N 64°04′53″W |
| | North River Falls | Victoria | East Branch North River | | | | | 46°22′13″N 60°41′59″W |
| | North River Upper Falls | Colchester | | | | | | 45°27′10″N 64°04′29″W |
| | Northeast Brook Falls | Halifax | | | | | | 44°43′06″N 63°53′46″W |
| | Northntervale Falls | Guysborough | | | | | | 45°29′19″N 61°39′45″W |
| | Northntervale Upper Falls | Guysborough | | | | | | 45°29′20″N 61°39′46″W |
| | Northwest Arm Brook Falls | St. Mary's | | | | | | 45°08′27″N 62°00′12″W |
| | Nuttall Brook Falls | Halifax | | | | | | 44°56′40″N 63°19′49″W |
| | Nuttby Falls | Colchester | | | | | | 45°31′12″N 63°12′33″W |
| | O'Toole Brook Falls | East Hants | | | | | | 45°08′13″N 63°36′57″W |
| | Ogilvie Brook Falls | Kings | | | | | | 45°08′10″N 64°50′59″W |
| | Ohio Millstream Falls | Yarmouth | | | | | | 43°53′39″N 66°05′48″W |
| | Old Baxter Mill Rd Falls | Kings | | | | | | 45°13′13″N 64°32′52″W |
| | Old Bridge Falls | Victoria | | | | | | 46°14′41″N 60°27′28″W |
| | Old Sam Brook Falls | Colchester | | | | | | 45°29′58″N 63°22′21″W |
| | Old Sanford Brook Falls | East Hants | | | | | | 45°05′03″N 63°48′03″W |
| | Old Union Rd Falls | Colchester | | | | | | 45°23′27″N 63°09′26″W |
| | Otter Brook Falls | Colchester | | | | | | 45°16′11″N 63°00′15″W |
| | Parks Falls | Pictou | | | | | | 45°33′16″N 62°30′53″W |
| | Partridge River Falls | Halifax | | | | | | 44°43′22″N 63°24′54″W |
| | Pathend Brook Falls | Victoria | | | | | | 46°35′20″N 60°24′48″W |
| | Peace Brook Falls | Kings | | | | | | 45°12′27″N 64°35′19″W |
| | Peggy Brook Falls | East Hants | | | | | | 44°49′07″N 63°50′39″W |
| | Pembroke Brook Falls | Inverness | | | | | | 46°30′08″N 61°02′49″W |
| | Pembroke Tributary Falls | Colchester | | | | | | 45°17′57″N 62°58′09″W |
| | Pennant River Falls | Halifax | | | | | | 44°28′36″N 63°37′44″W |
| | Pete's Brook Falls | Annapolis | | | | | | 44°52′03″N 65°07′15″W |
| | Petite Rivière Falls | Lunenburg | | | | | | 44°15′44″N 64°29′08″W |
| | Phantom Lake Falls | Halifax | | | | | | 44°53′22″N 63°38′59″W |
| | Pilgrimage Falls | Victoria | | | | | | 46°53′28″N 60°33′43″W |
| | Pine Brook Falls | Colchester | | | | | | 45°30′03″N 63°29′14″W |
| | Pine Brook lower Falls | Colchester | | | | | | 45°29′52″N 63°29′14″W |
| | Pineo Vault Brook Falls | Kings | | | | | | 45°13′51″N 64°28′32″W |
| | Pockwock River Falls | Halifax | | | | | | 44°45′26″N 63°52′04″W |
| | Poison Ivy Falls | Annapolis | | | | | | 44°19′10″N 65°20′24″W |
| | Polls Brook Falls | Victoria | | | | | | 46°57′23″N 60°27′22″W |
| | Polson's Brook Falls | Antigonish | | | | | | 45°26′47″N 61°55′31″W |
| | Polsons Brook Falls | Antigonish | | | | | | 45°26′47″N 61°55′43″W |
| | Poltz Falls | Queens | | | | | | 44°11′38″N 64°42′20″W |
| | Poole Brook Falls | Annapolis | | | | | | 44°54′33″N 65°17′28″W |
| | Poor Trout Brook Falls | Halifax | | | | | | 44°48′06″N 63°30′59″W |
| | Porcupine Falls | Kings | | | | | | 45°13′55″N 64°30′08″W |
| | Portapique River Falls | Cumberland | | | | | | 45°32′08″N 63°42′55″W |
| | Portapique River Tributary Falls | Colchester | | | | | | 45°29′05″N 63°42′00″W |
| | Portland Estates Falls | Halifax | | | | | | 44°40′00″N 63°31′04″W |
| | Potomac Falls | Shelburne | | | | | | 43°57′55″N 65°31′36″W |
| | Prospect Falls | Cumberland | | | | | | 45°25′53″N 64°16′09″W |
| | Quarry Lake Falls | Halifax | | | | | | 44°29′10″N 63°43′06″W |
| | Quinns Falls | Barrington | | | | | | 43°40′00″N 65°29′02″W |
| | Railroad Falls | Colchester | | | | | | 45°29′53″N 63°31′50″W |
| | Rainbow Heaven mini Falls | Halifax | | | | | | 44°38′29″N 63°25′11″W |
| | Rainy Cove Brook Falls | West Hants | | | | | | 45°13′14″N 64°04′05″W |
| | Randall Falls | Argyle | | | | | | 44°07′33″N 65°51′00″W |
| | Raven Head Falls | Cumberland | | | | | | 45°31′17″N 64°43′01″W |
| | Ray Brook Falls | Kings | | | | | | 45°07′29″N 64°53′29″W |
| | Refugee Cove Brook Falls | Cumberland | | | | | | 45°20′25″N 64°54′24″W |
| | Reid Station Rd Falls | Colchester | | | | | | 45°09′05″N 63°06′14″W |
| | Renfrew Falls | East Hants | | | | | | 45°00′10″N 63°37′01″W |
| | Rennie Brook Cove Falls | East Hants | | | | | | 45°15′51″N 63°56′00″W |
| | Rhodenizer Brook Falls | Lunenburg | | | | | | 44°22′38″N 64°28′39″W |
| | Rights River Falls | Antigonish | | | | | | 45°42′01″N 62°06′23″W |
| | Rigwash Brook Falls | Inverness | | | | | | 46°40′30″N 60°57′05″W |
| | River Tillard Falls | Richmond | | | | | | 45°39′48″N 60°58′07″W |
| | Roaring Brook Falls | Cumberland | | | | | | 45°36′01″N 63°39′19″W |
| | Roaring Brook Falls | West Hants | | | | | | 44°47′01″N 64°14′16″W |
| | Robinson Brook Falls | Kings | | | | | | 45°06′22″N 64°55′39″W |
| | Rockland Brook Falls | Colchester | | | | | | 45°29′04″N 63°36′10″W |
| | Rockland Brook Tributary Falls | Colchester | | | | | | 45°30′28″N 63°35′38″W |
| | Rockville Notch Falls | Kings | | | | | | 44°57′05″N 64°53′33″W |
| | Rocky Brook Falls | Chester | | | | | | 44°47′14″N 64°22′51″W |
| | Rocky Brook Falls | Halifax | | | | | | 44°54′47″N 63°38′23″W |
| | Rocky Brook Falls | Inverness | | | | | | 46°31′53″N 60°53′08″W |
| | Rocky Brook Lower Falls | Halifax | | | | | | 44°54′05″N 63°38′02″W |
| | Rocky Lake Brook Falls | Halifax | | | | | | 44°56′39″N 62°33′24″W |
| | Rocky Mountain Falls | Pictou | | | | | | 45°23′28″N 62°14′17″W |
| | Roper Brook Falls | Victoria | | | | | | 46°43′06″N 60°28′22″W |
| | Roseway River Dam Falls | Shelburne | | | | | | 43°47′01″N 65°20′37″W |
| | Roseway River Falls | Shelburne | | | | | | 43°52′03″N 65°23′37″W |
| | Ross Creek Falls | Kings | | | | | | 45°14′34″N 64°26′45″W |
| | Rough Brook Falls | Inverness | | | | | | 45°46′40″N 61°23′31″W |
| | Round Hill Falls | Annapolis | | | | | | 44°45′27″N 65°24′14″W |
| | Roxbury Brook Falls | Annapolis | | | | | | 44°50′25″N 65°11′05″W |
| | Roxbury Brook Lower Falls | Annapolis | | | | | | 44°50′55″N 65°11′21″W |
| | Roxbury Tributary Brook Falls | Annapolis | | | | | | 44°50′30″N 65°11′00″W |
| | Ruisseau a Charles Black Falls | Clare | | | | | | 44°12′42″N 66°07′55″W |
| | Ruisseau des Plées Ferrées Falls | Inverness | | | | | | 46°38′52″N 60°55′57″W |
| | Ruth Falls | Halifax | | | | | | 44°57′15″N 62°29′57″W |
| | Rutherford Falls | Colchester | | | | | | 45°19′23″N 63°05′39″W |
| | Sackville River Falls | Halifax | | | | | | 44°52′53″N 63°44′04″W |
| | Saint Columba's Falls | Victoria | | | | | | 46°00′12″N 60°52′35″W |
| | Salmon Falls | Chester | | | | | | 44°39′23″N 64°27′11″W |
| | Salmon River (MicMac) Falls | Clare | | | | | | 44°05′22″N 66°05′21″W |
| | Salmon River Falls | Halifax | | | | | | 44°55′05″N 62°23′02″W |
| | Salt Brook Falls | Inverness | | | | | | 45°58′38″N 61°05′41″W |
| | Salt Spring Brook Falls | Colchester | | | | | | 45°28′57″N 63°34′47″W |
| | Salters Falls | Queens | | | | | | 44°08′45″N 64°38′57″W |
| | Saltwater Brook Falls | Inverness | | | | | | 45°58′39″N 61°05′39″W |
| | Sam Cameron Falls | Pictou | | | | | | 45°26′07″N 62°34′09″W |
| | Sam Higgins Falls | Colchester | | | | | | 45°30′03″N 63°20′45″W |
| | Sam Higgins Gorge and Falls | Colchester | | | | | | 45°30′06″N 63°20′42″W |
| | Sandy Cole Brook Falls | Halifax | | | | | | 44°54′37″N 63°30′53″W |
| | Saunders Brook Falls | Kings | | | | | | 45°09′32″N 64°47′06″W |
| | School Road Branch Falls | Antigonish | | | | | | 45°37′01″N 62°04′21″W |
| | Schoolhouse Brook Falls | Annapolis | | | | | | 44°56′18″N 65°15′14″W |
| | Scotland Falls | Shelburne | | | | | | 44°03′35″N 65°25′53″W |
| | Second Branch Humes River Falls | Victoria | | | | | | 46°03′50″N 60°58′36″W |
| | Second River Falls | Cumberland | | | | | | 45°34′11″N 63°49′57″W |
| | Seven Falls | Annapolis | | | | | | 45°00′40″N 65°02′19″W |
| | Seven Falls | Victoria | | | | | | 46°19′05″N 60°28′46″W |
| | Seven Mile Stream Falls | Halifax | | | | | | 45°02′58″N 62°36′07″W |
| | Sharpe Brook Falls | Kings | | | | | | 45°01′51″N 64°38′17″W |
| | Shea Brook Falls | Chester | | | | | | 44°42′04″N 64°14′33″W |
| | Sheepsherder Brook Falls | Annapolis | | | | | | 44°58′25″N 65°11′56″W |
| | Sheffield Vault Bluff Falls | Kings | | | | | | 45°12′36″N 64°34′22″W |
| | Sheffield Vault Brook Falls | Kings | | | | | | 45°12′24″N 64°33′31″W |
| | Sherbrooke Brook Falls | Chester | | | | | | 44°43′37″N 64°38′32″W |
| | Sheridan Falls | Lunenburg | | | | | | 44°32′19″N 64°45′05″W |
| | Sherlock Brook Falls | Halifax | | | | | | 45°06′25″N 62°56′45″W |
| | Shingle Mill Falls | Kings | | | | | | 44°55′52″N 64°46′09″W |
| | Shingle Mill Falls | Lunenburg | | | | | | 44°34′43″N 64°45′17″W |
| | Simms Brook Falls | West Hants | | | | | | 44°46′25″N 64°09′10″W |
| | Simpson Lake Falls | Colchester | | | | | | 45°30′04″N 63°56′17″W |
| | Sissiboo tributary Falls | Digby | | | | | | 44°24′24″N 65°57′27″W |
| | Six Mile Brook Falls | Pictou | | | | | | 45°33′33″N 62°57′05″W |
| | Six Mile Lake Brook Falls | Halifax | | | | | | 44°39′00″N 63°43′05″W |
| | Skerry Falls | Chester | | | | | | 44°41′11″N 64°26′57″W |
| | Skinner Brook Falls | Halifax | | | | | | 44°40′27″N 64°04′27″W |
| | Slaty Brook Falls | East Hants | | | | | | 44°57′09″N 63°36′15″W |
| | Sleepy Hollow Falls | Kings | | | | | | 45°10′57″N 64°29′54″W |
| | Slokum Brook Falls | Annapolis | | | | | | 44°58′09″N 65°06′55″W |
| | Slough Brook Falls | Chester | | | | | | 44°39′16″N 64°17′14″W |
| | Small Falls | Antigonish | | | | | | 45°45′03″N 62°11′00″W |
| | Small Falls | Colchester | | | | | | 45°27′14″N 64°02′35″W |
| | Small Sandy Cole Brook Falls | Halifax | | | | | | 44°54′46″N 63°30′32″W |
| | Smelt Brook Falls | Halifax | | | | | | 44°41′03″N 63°55′05″W |
| | Smeltzer Brook Falls | West Hants | | | | | | 44°48′48″N 64°13′35″W |
| | Smith Brook Falls | Cumberland | | | | | | 45°35′43″N 63°34′07″W |
| | Smith Brook Valley mini Falls | Cumberland | | | | | | 45°37′09″N 63°27′50″W |
| | Soldier Cove Brook Falls | Richmond | | | | | | 45°41′45″N 60°44′11″W |
| | Soley Brook Falls | Colchester | | | | | | 45°20′25″N 63°20′14″W |
| | Sorrow Falls | Barrington | | | | | | 43°35′38″N 65°34′36″W |
| | South Branch Musquodoboit River Falls | Halifax | | | | | | 45°09′27″N 62°53′15″W |
| | South Brook Falls | Guysborough | | | | | | 45°27′12″N 61°39′12″W |
| | South Brook Falls | Kings | | | | | | 44°59′23″N 64°47′02″W |
| | South Corney Brook FallsI | Inverness | | | | | | 46°42′27″N 60°54′12″W |
| | South Nile Brook Falls | Inverness | | | | | | 46°20′30″N 60°55′34″W |
| | Spencer Brook Falls | Colchester | | | | | | 45°28′38″N 63°39′24″W |
| | Spider Lake Brook Falls | Halifax | | | | | | 44°45′44″N 63°30′51″W |
| | Spinney Mtn Falls | Annapolis | | | | | | 44°55′14″N 64°56′44″W |
| | St Croix Cove Falls | Annapolis | | | | | | 44°54′49″N 65°19′12″W |
| | St Croix Falls | West Hants | | | | | | 44°57′42″N 64°01′59″W |
| | St James Falls | Cape Breton | | | | | | 46°13′42″N 60°24′36″W |
| | St Mary's River Falls | St. Mary's | | | | | | 45°17′25″N 62°37′25″W |
| | Starratt Brook Falls | Annapolis | | | | | | 44°56′26″N 65°13′35″W |
| | Starratt Brook Tributary Falls | Annapolis | | | | | | 44°56′07″N 65°13′53″W |
| | Steele Run Falls | Colchester | | | | | | 45°29′43″N 63°01′57″W |
| | Stewart Brook Falls | Inverness | | | | | | 46°27′33″N 60°56′21″W |
| | Stewart Hill Falls | Colchester | | | | | | 45°10′27″N 62°57′39″W |
| | Stewiacke Tributary Falls | Colchester | | | | | | 45°19′01″N 62°53′07″W |
| | Still Brook Waterfall | Victoria | Still Brook | | | | | 46°46′38″N 63°19′55″W |
| | Stirling Brook Falls | East Hants | | | | | | 45°17′23″N 63°32′51″W |
| | Sucker Brook Falls | Colchester | | | | | | 45°18′31″N 62°51′53″W |
| | Sullivan Vault Brook Falls | Kings | | | | | | 45°10′59″N 64°38′15″W |
| | Sutherlands River Falls | Pictou | | | | | | 45°31′49″N 62°30′16″W |
| | Swan Creek Falls | Cumberland | | | | | | 45°23′15″N 64°15′16″W |
| | Sweeney's Falls | Yarmouth | | | | | | 43°52′56″N 66°00′51″W |
| | Tannery Brook Falls | Halifax | | | | | | 44°53′01″N 63°35′33″W |
| | Taylor Bay Brook Falls | Halifax | | | | | | 44°51′05″N 62°38′06″W |
| | Taylor's Falls | Annapolis | | | | | | 44°56′23″N 65°03′14″W |
| | Teapot Falls | Cape Breton | | | | | | 45°57′59″N 60°40′26″W |
| | Tent Brook Falls | Halifax | | | | | | 45°01′20″N 62°40′24″W |
| | Terence Bay River Falls | Halifax | | | | | | 44°30′34″N 63°44′21″W |
| | The Great Falls | Cumberland | | | | | | 45°26′25″N 64°10′35″W |
| | The Pot Hole Falls | Colchester | | | | | | 45°29′55″N 63°56′19″W |
| | Thompkins Brook Falls | Inverness | | | | | | 46°16′04″N 61°00′18″W |
| | Three Mile Pond Falls | Guysborough | | | | | | 45°20′23″N 61°36′10″W |
| | Three Pools Falls | Kings | | | | | | 45°02′34″N 64°24′29″W |
| | Timber Brook Falls | Victoria | | | | | | 46°19′43″N 60°39′04″W |
| | Tom's Brook Falls | Richmond | | | | | | 45°44′45″N 60°42′10″W |
| | Tomahak Lake Falls | Halifax | | | | | | 44°46′52″N 63°46′33″W |
| | Totten Brook Falls | Colchester | | | | | | 45°29′32″N 63°28′02″W |
| | Totten Lake Falls | Colchester | | | | | | 45°29′47″N 63°26′59″W |
| | TR's Brook Falls | Digby | | | | | | 44°29′41″N 66°03′51″W |
| | Tracadie River Falls | Guysborough | | | | | | 45°32′59″N 61°35′45″W |
| | Trap Falls | Shelburne | | | | | | 43°59′10″N 65°31′20″W |
| | Tributary Falls | Colchester | | | | | | 45°30′46″N 63°20′46″W |
| | Tributary to Falls Brook Falls | Victoria | | | | | | 46°12′50″N 60°47′50″W |
| | Tributary to Franklin Bk Falls | Digby | | | | | | 44°33′17″N 65°39′27″W |
| | Tributary to West Branch Chiganois River Falls | Colchester | | | | | | 45°31′27″N 63°22′13″W |
| | Tributary West Moose River Falls | Cumberland | | | | | | 45°25′38″N 64°13′07″W |
| | Trout Hole Falls | Barrington | | | | | | 43°46′45″N 65°30′12″W |
| | Tumble Falls | Clare | | | | | | 44°09′54″N 65°51′13″W |
| | Tumbledown Falls | Cumberland | | | | | | 45°31′12″N 64°44′42″W |
| | Tunnel Brook Falls | Colchester | | | | | | 45°24′15″N 63°05′35″W |
| | Tupper Lake Brook Falls | Kings | | | | | | 45°02′05″N 64°35′54″W |
| | Tupperville Falls | Annapolis | | | | | | 44°47′12″N 65°21′28″W |
| | Turnbulls Brook Falls | Digby | | | | | | 44°41′00″N 65°46′25″W |
| | Turner Brook Falls | Inverness | | | | | | 46°30′23″N 60°55′18″W |
| | Tusket Gulch Falls | Yarmouth | | | | | | 44°01′26″N 65°55′07″W |
| | Twin Falls | Annapolis | | | | | | 44°56′39″N 65°13′51″W |
| | Twin Falls | Cumberland | | | | | | 45°25′42″N 64°14′39″W |
| | Uisge Ban Falls | Victoria | Falls Brook | | | | | 46°12′53″N 60°46′43″W |
| | Unnamed brook Falls | St. Mary's | | | | | | 45°17′11″N 62°33′01″W |
| | Upper Bass River of 5slands Falls | Colchester | | | | | | 45°30′42″N 64°03′13″W |
| | Upper Black Brook Falls | Pictou | | | | | | 45°25′44″N 62°10′20″W |
| | Upper Blue Falls | Annapolis | | | | | | 44°57′35″N 65°12′24″W |
| | Upper Bumpers Brook Falls | Cumberland | | | | | | 45°25′52″N 64°13′42″W |
| | Upper East Folly River Falls | Colchester | | | | | | 45°32′07″N 63°29′45″W |
| | Upper Economy Falls | Colchester | | | | | | 45°23′40″N 63°51′04″W |
| | Upper Economy River Falls | Colchester | | | | | | 45°26′49″N 63°55′08″W |
| | Upper Falls Brook Falls | Victoria | | | | | | 46°12′51″N 60°47′36″W |
| | Upper New Prospect Brook Falls | Cumberland | | | | | | 45°26′09″N 64°16′08″W |
| | Upper Oban WaterFalls | Richmond | | | | | | 45°43′56″N 60°54′54″W |
| | Upper Poole Brook Falls | Annapolis | | | | | | 44°54′33″N 65°17′25″W |
| | Upper Rockland Brook Falls | Cumberland | | | | | | 45°32′43″N 63°36′35″W |
| | Upper Sackville River Falls | Halifax | | | | | | 44°47′50″N 63°46′44″W |
| | Upper Timber Brook Falls | Victoria | | | | | | 46°20′50″N 60°39′03″W |
| | Upper Tupper Brook Falls | Annapolis | | | | | | 44°46′28″N 65°19′40″W |
| | Upper Vaughan Falls | West Hants | | | | | | 44°47′55″N 64°14′15″W |
| | Valley Mill Falls | Inverness | | | | | | 45°50′27″N 61°06′14″W |
| | Valley station Falls | Colchester | | | | | | 45°22′53″N 63°10′02″W |
| | Vamey's Brook Falls | Pictou | | | | | | 45°40′41″N 62°13′15″W |
| | Veinot Brook Falls | Lunenburg | | | | | | 44°21′38″N 64°30′05″W |
| | Victoria Beach Falls | Annapolis | | | | | | 44°40′42″N 65°45′16″W |
| | Waddell Falls | Truro | | | | | | 45°21′10″N 63°16′11″W |
| | Wallace Brook Falls | Pictou | | | | | | 45°32′32″N 62°26′00″W |
| | Walsh Brook Falls | Digby | | | | | | 44°35′05″N 65°43′36″W |
| | Wamboldt Falls | Annapolis | | | | | | 44°51′11″N 65°02′03″W |
| | Ward's Falls | Cumberland | | | | | | 45°26′50″N 64°25′11″W |
| | Wards Falls canyon | Cumberland | | | | | | 45°26′55″N 64°25′08″W |
| | Warren Brook Falls | Victoria | | | | | | 46°43′40″N 60°27′49″W |
| | Waugh River Falls | Colchester | | | | | | 45°38′19″N 63°13′11″W |
| | Webber Lake Tributary Falls | Halifax | | | | | | 44°46′43″N 63°43′33″W |
| | Weir Falls | Halifax | | | | | | 44°55′01″N 62°44′18″W |
| | Weir Falls | St. Mary's | | | | | | 45°02′05″N 62°06′14″W |
| | Wells Brook Falls | Guysborough | | | | | | 45°24′52″N 61°30′59″W |
| | Welsh Brook Falls | Halifax | | | | | | 44°31′28″N 63°49′30″W |
| | Wentworth Falls | Cumberland | | | | | | 45°35′16″N 63°33′52″W |
| | Wentworth Valley Falls | Cumberland | | | | | | 45°36′19″N 63°33′39″W |
| | Wentzells Falls | Lunenburg | | | | | | 44°27′42″N 64°37′17″W |
| | West Avon River Falls | West Hants | | | | | | 44°54′04″N 64°19′16″W |
| | West Bass River Tributary Falls | Colchester | | | | | | 45°27′46″N 63°47′54″W |
| | West Bear River Falls | Digby | | | | | | 44°32′58″N 65°37′54″W |
| | West Branch Bass River Falls | Colchester | | | | | | 45°27′34″N 63°48′57″W |
| | West Branch Chiganois River Falls | Colchester | | | | | | 45°31′30″N 63°22′12″W |
| | West Branch East River Falls | Colchester | | | | | | 45°28′35″N 63°59′29″W |
| | West Branch Economy River Falls | Colchester | | | | | | 45°29′46″N 63°56′44″W |
| | West Branch French River Falls | Pictou | | | | | | 45°30′31″N 62°27′26″W |
| | West Branch Moose River Gorge Falls | Cumberland | | | | | | 45°26′09″N 64°12′14″W |
| | West Branch North River Falls | Colchester | | | | | | 45°30′39″N 63°16′09″W |
| | West Branch North River Falls | Victoria | | | | | | 46°20′07″N 60°43′16″W |
| | West Brook Falls | Halifax | | | | | | 44°49′54″N 63°24′59″W |
| | West Brook tributary Falls | Halifax | | | | | | 44°49′11″N 63°24′10″W |
| | West Brooklyn Falls | Kings | | | | | | 45°04′36″N 64°16′33″W |
| | West Earltown Falls | Colchester | | | | | | 45°35′23″N 63°12′58″W |
| | West McElmon Brook Falls | Colchester | | | | | | 45°29′20″N 63°33′44″W |
| | West Moose River Falls | Annapolis | | | | | | 44°37′46″N 65°33′48″W |
| | West Moose River Tributary Falls | Cumberland | | | | | | 45°25′44″N 64°13′09″W |
| | West North Branch River Falls | Colchester | | | | | | 45°30′15″N 63°16′02″W |
| | West River Pictou Falls | Pictou | | | | | | 45°30′28″N 62°54′19″W |
| | West Sheet Harbour Falls | Halifax | | | | | | 45°03′00″N 62°48′03″W |
| | West Taylor Brook Falls | Halifax | | | | | | 44°51′15″N 62°38′31″W |
| | Westchester Valley Falls | Cumberland | | | | | | 45°35′45″N 63°43′13″W |
| | Western Brook Falls | Halifax | | | | | | 44°51′43″N 62°34′32″W |
| | Weymouth Falls | Digby | | | | | | 44°24′20″N 65°56′36″W |
| | Whalesback Falls | Lunenburg | | | | | | 44°37′15″N 64°45′41″W |
| | Wheelock Falls | Lunenburg | | | | | | 44°35′18″N 64°45′55″W |
| | White Brook Falls | Colchester | | | | | | 45°33′15″N 63°06′22″W |
| | Whites Falls | Shelburne | | | | | | 43°54′34″N 65°20′48″W |
| | Whiteside Falls | Richmond | | | | | | 45°36′29″N 61°11′10″W |
| | Whitford Falls | Chester | | | | | | 44°36′41″N 64°09′30″W |
| | Whittier Brook Falls | East Hants | | | | | | 45°04′58″N 63°42′29″W |
| | Wier Brook Falls | West Hants | | | | | | 44°57′41″N 63°58′30″W |
| | Wier Brook Tributary Falls | West Hants | | | | | | 44°56′56″N 63°57′15″W |
| | Wildcat Falls | Queens | | | | | | 44°21′35″N 64°55′53″W |
| | Wile Carding Mill Falls | Bridgewater | | | | | | 44°22′35″N 64°31′56″W |
| | Wiles Brook Falls | Bridgewater | | | | | | 44°22′55″N 64°31′36″W |
| | Wilson Brook Falls | Cumberland | | | | | | 45°30′46″N 63°44′56″W |
| | Wilson Falls | Halifax | | | | | | 45°01′26″N 62°17′38″W |
| | Wood Brook Falls | East Hants | | | | | | 45°01′00″N 63°51′31″W |
| | Woodville Falls | Kings | | | | | | 45°07′44″N 64°40′15″W |
| | Wreck Cove Brook Falls | Victoria | | | | | | 46°32′25″N 60°27′37″W |
| | Wreck Point Falls | Cape Breton | | | | | | 46°10′45″N 59°48′56″W |
| | Wrights Brook Falls | Halifax | | | | | | 44°42′24″N 63°37′09″W |
| | Yankee Lake Falls | St. Mary's | | | | | | 45°06′20″N 62°10′58″W |
| | Yankee Line Road Falls | Victoria | | | | | | 46°06′09″N 60°55′14″W |
| | Zachs Falls | Argyle | | | | | | 44°06′53″N 65°50′45″W |
| | Zwicker Falls | Lunenburg | | | | | | 44°30′56″N 64°46′26″W |

== See also ==
- List of waterfalls
- List of waterfalls in Canada
