= Scottsville =

Scottsville may refer to several places in the United States of America:

- Scottsville, California
- Scottsville, Kansas
- Scottsville, Kentucky
- Scottsville, New York
- Scottsville, Texas
- Scottsville, Virginia

== See also ==
- Scotsville
- Scottville (disambiguation)
