= Uisge Ban Falls =

Easach Ban
- Uisge Ban Waterfall
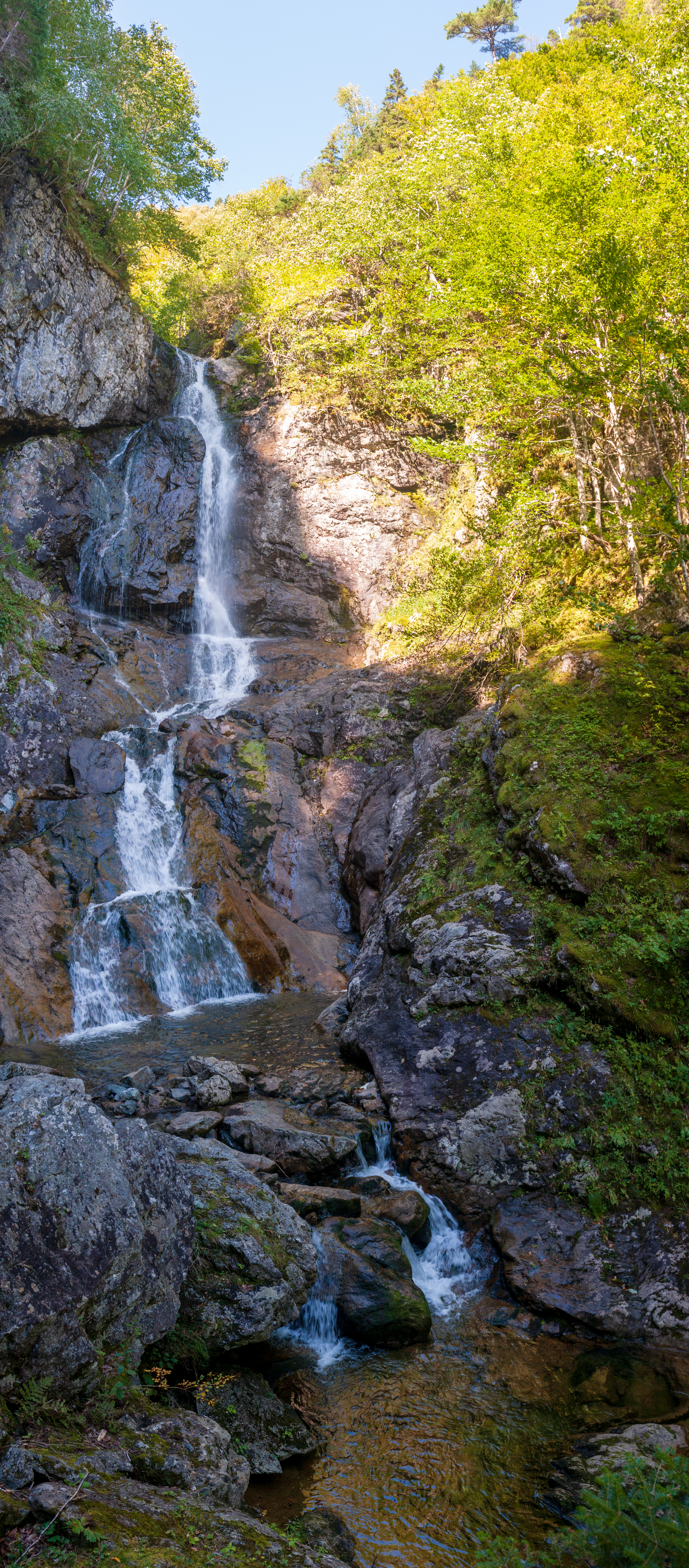
- Easach Ban, Victoria County, Nova Scotia

- Location within Nova Scotia Location within Canada
- Location: Uisge Ban Falls Provincial Park, New Glen, Nova Scotia, Canada
- Coordinates: 46°12′48.55″N 60°47′31.31″W
- Type: Plunge and Cascade
- Elevation: 200 metres (660 ft)
- Total height: 100 metres (330 ft)
- Number of drops: 2 prominent horsetail drops, plus cascade
- Longest drop: 16 metres (52 ft)
- Run: 715 metres (2,346 ft)
- Watercourse: Falls Brook

Uisge Ban Falls (official spelling "Easach Ban" alternative spellings "Uisage"; "Bàn" or "Bahn") is a waterfall near Baddeck, Nova Scotia, Canada. The falls is located in Uisge Ban Falls Provincial Park near New Glen, Victoria County, 14.5 kilometres (9 miles) north of Baddeck.

== Description ==
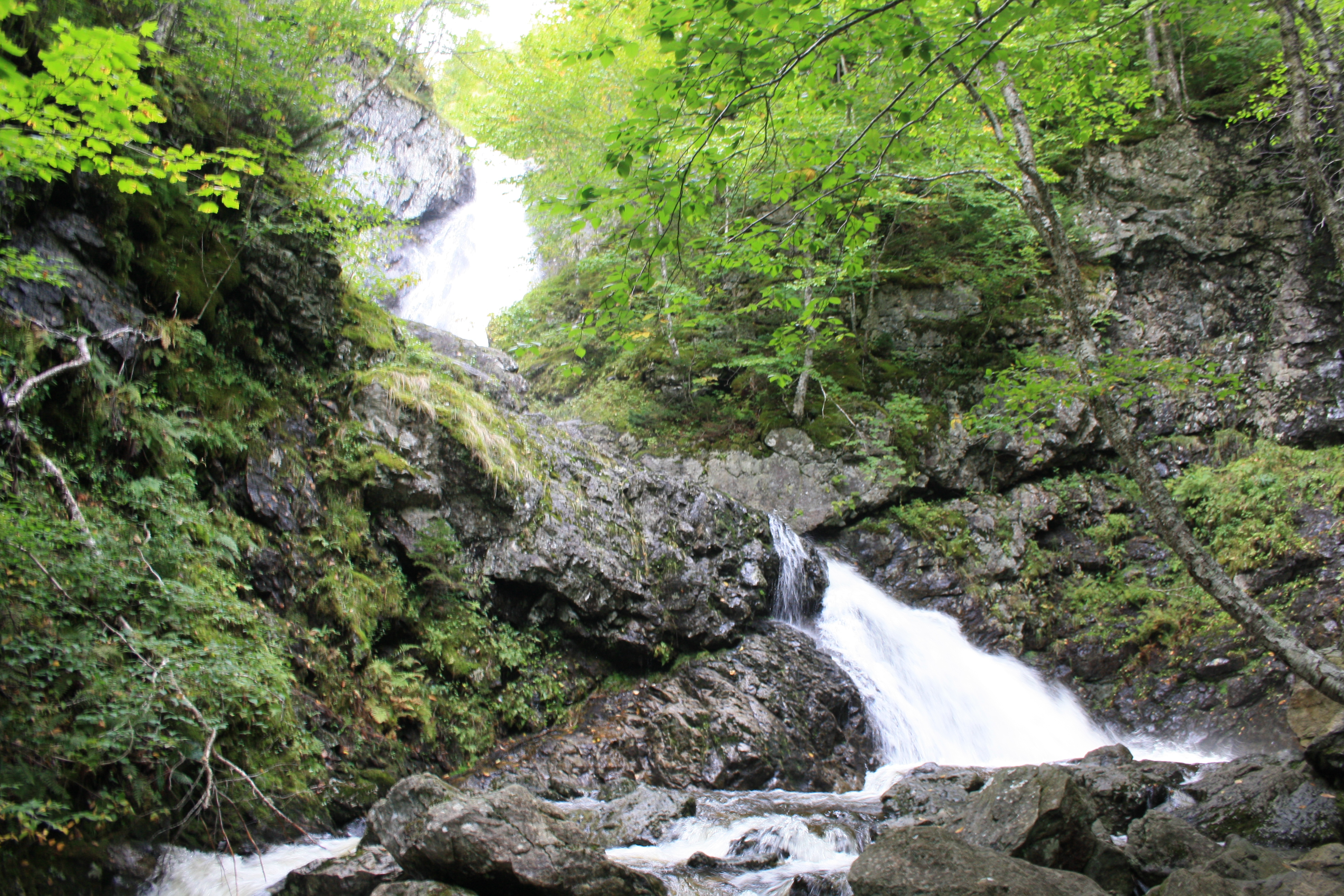
The Falls in September 2012

Easach Ban is a section of the longer Falls Brook, which flows into the North Branch Baddeck River, and eventually to St. Patricks Channel of the Bras d'Or Lake.

Easach Ban drops over 100 metres (330 ft) over a run of 715 metres (2,346 ft). While most of Easach Ban is a cascade, there is a prominent section that is a horsetail waterfall dropping 16 metres (52 ft) in multiple steps, with a pool 2/3 of the way down, between sections of the falls.

== Natural history ==
The landscape surrounding Easach Ban is a product or incredibly powerful forces which have shaped and reshaped the area over 5 billion years. Formation of the earth's landmass, tremendous volcanic activity, collision of continents, mountain-building, massive erosion and glaciation, have all played a role in shaping this landscape.

Easach Ban lies in a steep-sided river canyon, part of the landscape which forms the interface between the elevated Cape Breton Boreal Plateau and the lower Central Cape Breton Hills landscapes. Major river systems, such as the Baddeck River of which Easach Ban is part, originate on the boreal plateau, plunge down the steep slopes (approximately 300 metres (980 ft) in height), to eventually empty into the Bras d'Or Lakes. Rock types of this landscape are similar to those found in the boreal plateau - derived ancient granite, gneiss, and schist.

The Easach Ban canyon is filled by deciduous, coniferous, and mixed forests. Dominant tree species include sugar maple, yellow birch, beech, white spruce, and balsam fir. Provincially rare and uncommon plants occur in this canyon.

== Name ==
The name Uisge Ban comes from the Gaelic meaning “white water”, uisge bàn, probably conflated with the word eas meaning a waterfall.

The official name usage for the falls is confusing as most maps produced by the Government of the Province of Nova Scotia and by many tourist groups use either of the two spellings starting with a "U", sometimes using both spellings in the same document, yet the only official name that appears in either Government of Nova Scotia or Government of Canada, Canadian Geographical Names Data Base (CGNDB) is the "Easach Ban" spelling. The "Easach Ban" spelling is the only version used on Government of Canada topographical maps.

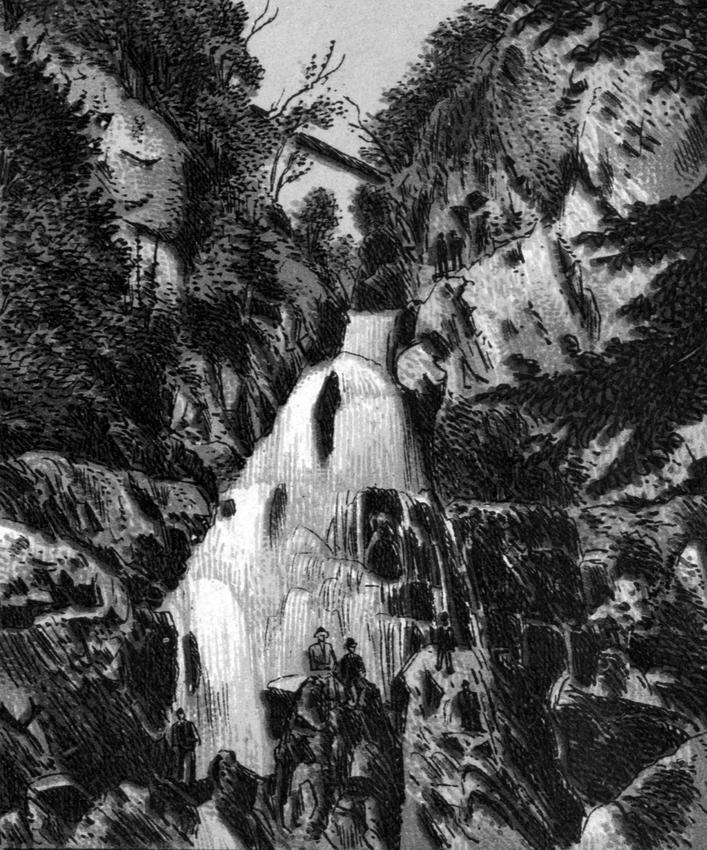
ca. 1900 A scrapbook image of Uisge Ban Falls. Item was donated to the Beaton Institute Archives by Malcolm McNeil of Boston.

== The Falls Trail ==
The waterfall is accessible by trail. The Falls Trail is approximately 3.0 kilometres (1.8 miles) in length (round trip), and requires about one hour to complete. The trail passes through a field then follows Falls Brook upstream through a mixed forest and then a climax hardwood forest composed largely of maple, birch, and beech. The deep stream valley narrows dramatically in the vicinity of Uisge Ban Waterfall. At the falls, the sheer walls of the gorge tower 150 metres (500 feet) on either side.

The original trail was developed with assistance from the Nova Scotia Forest Technicians Association. Recent improvements were undertaken by Stora Enso and the Nova Scotia Department of Natural Resources.

== Gallery ==
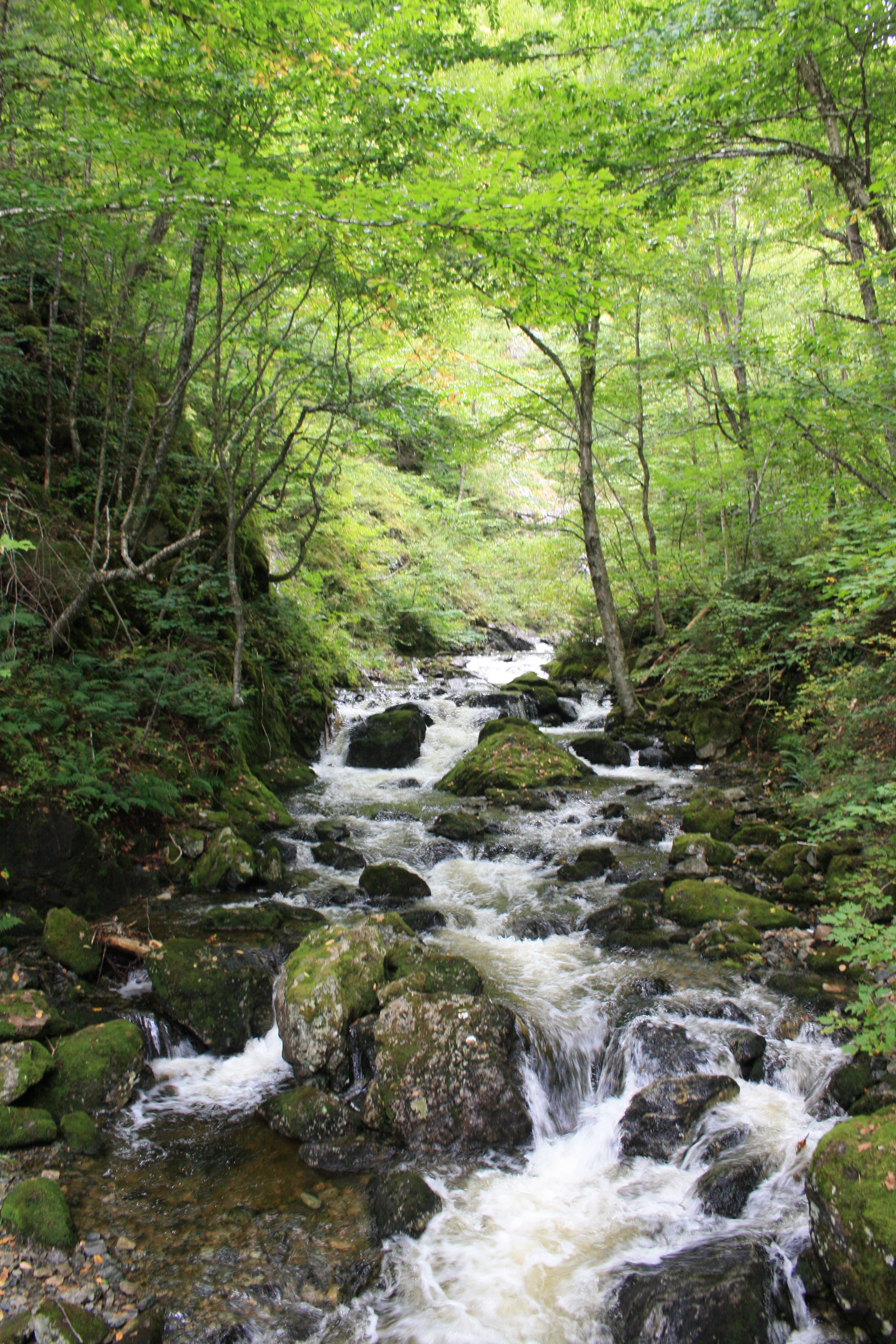
Along the Falls Trail

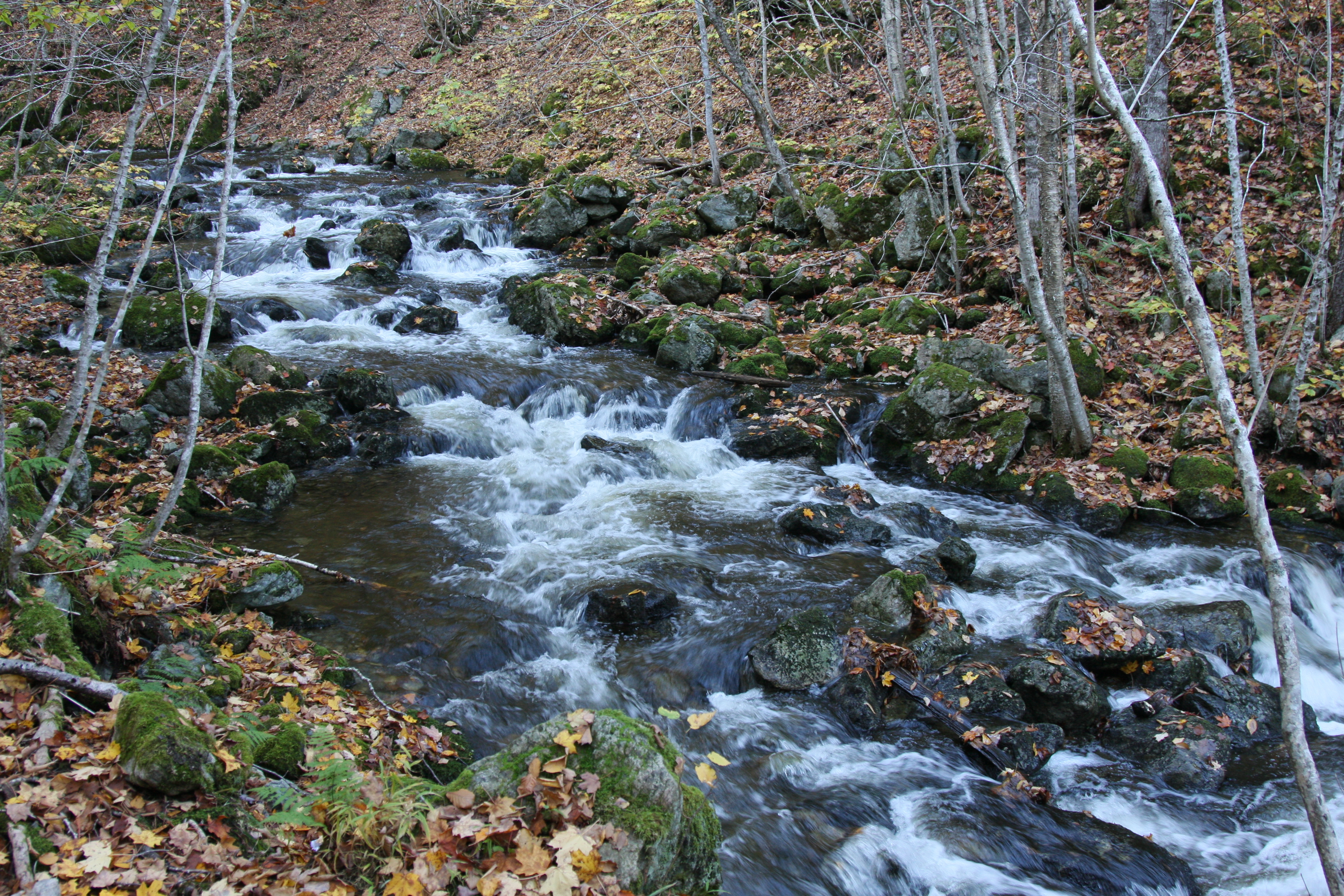
Along the Falls Trail

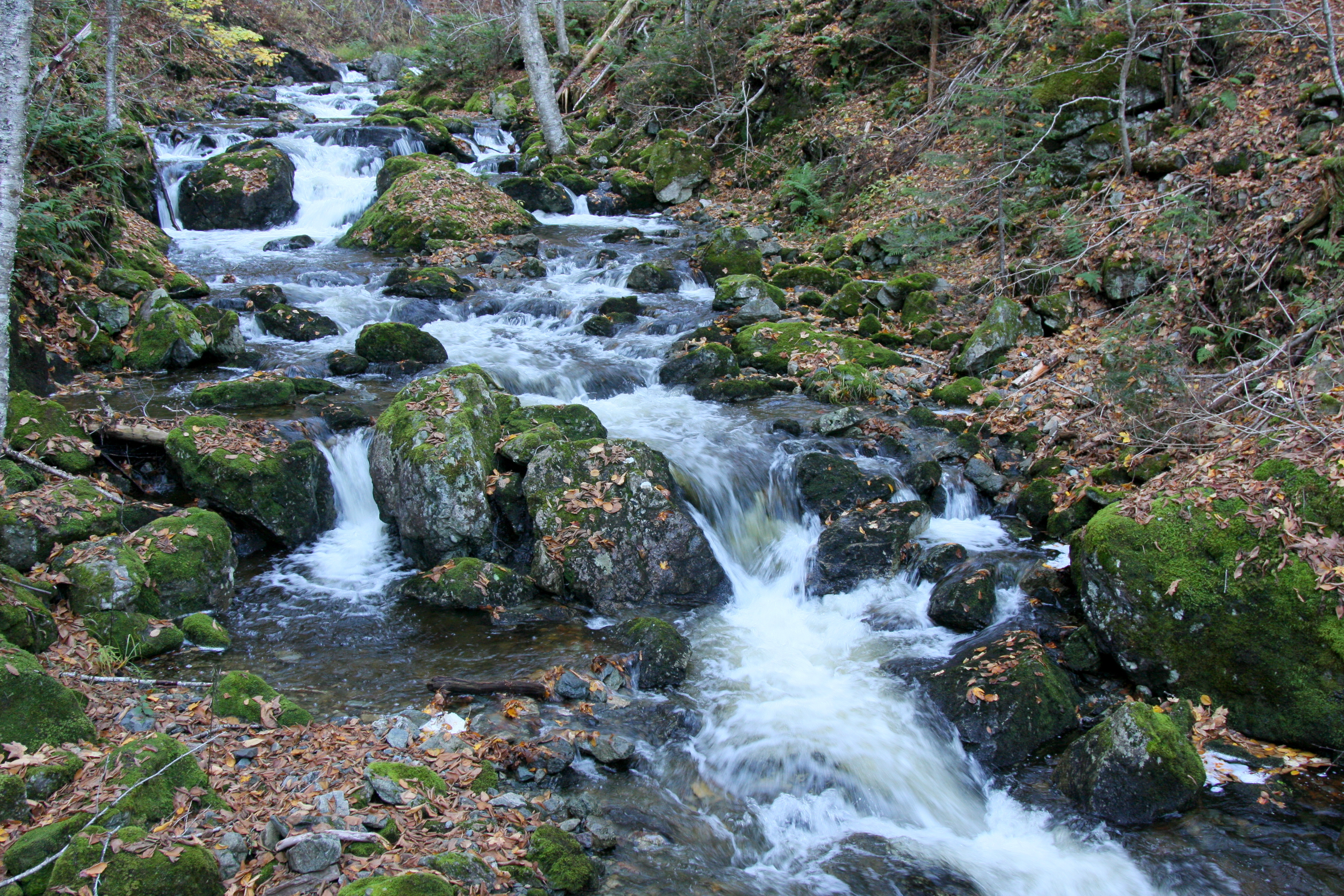
Along the Falls Trail

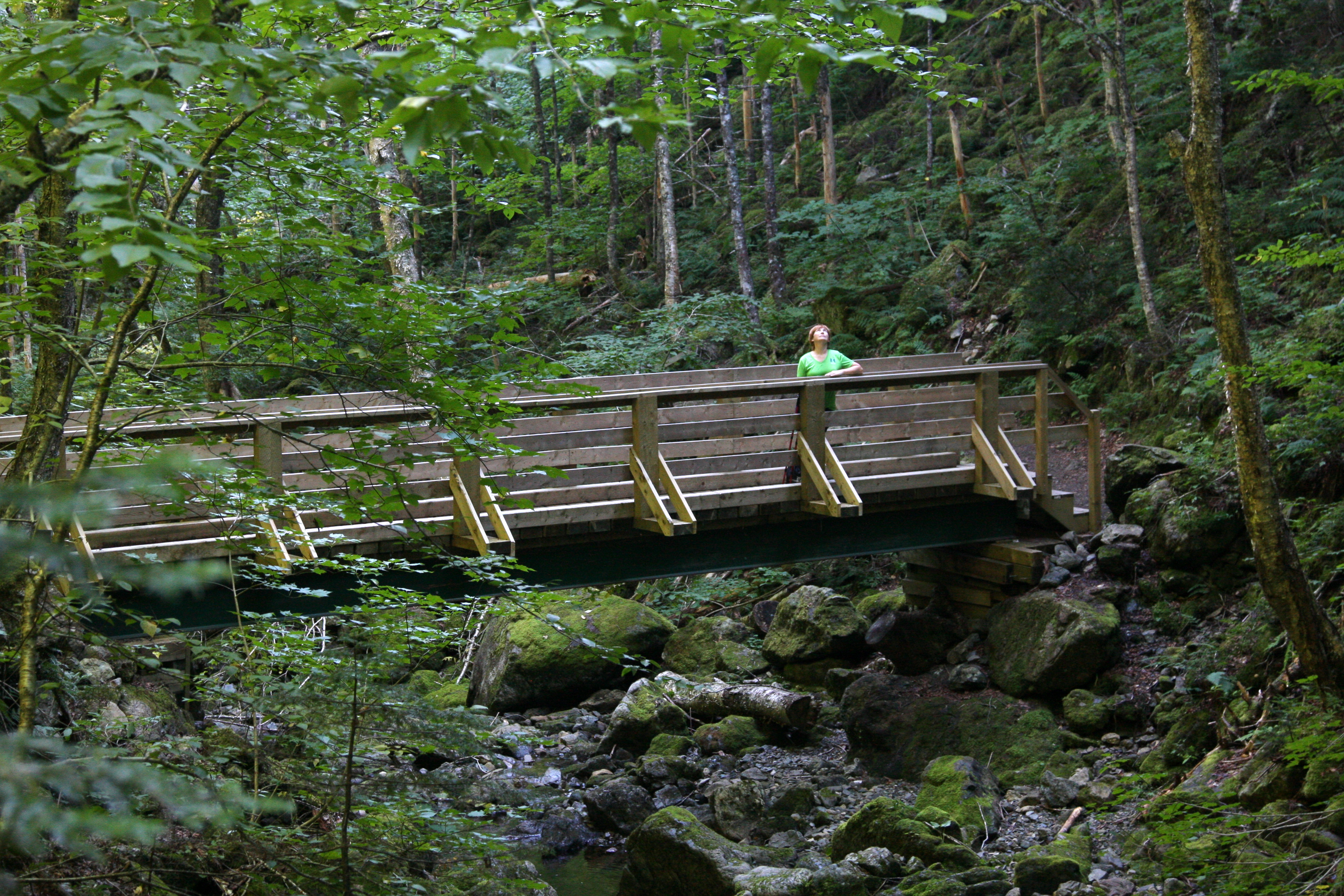
New Bridge on the Falls Trail

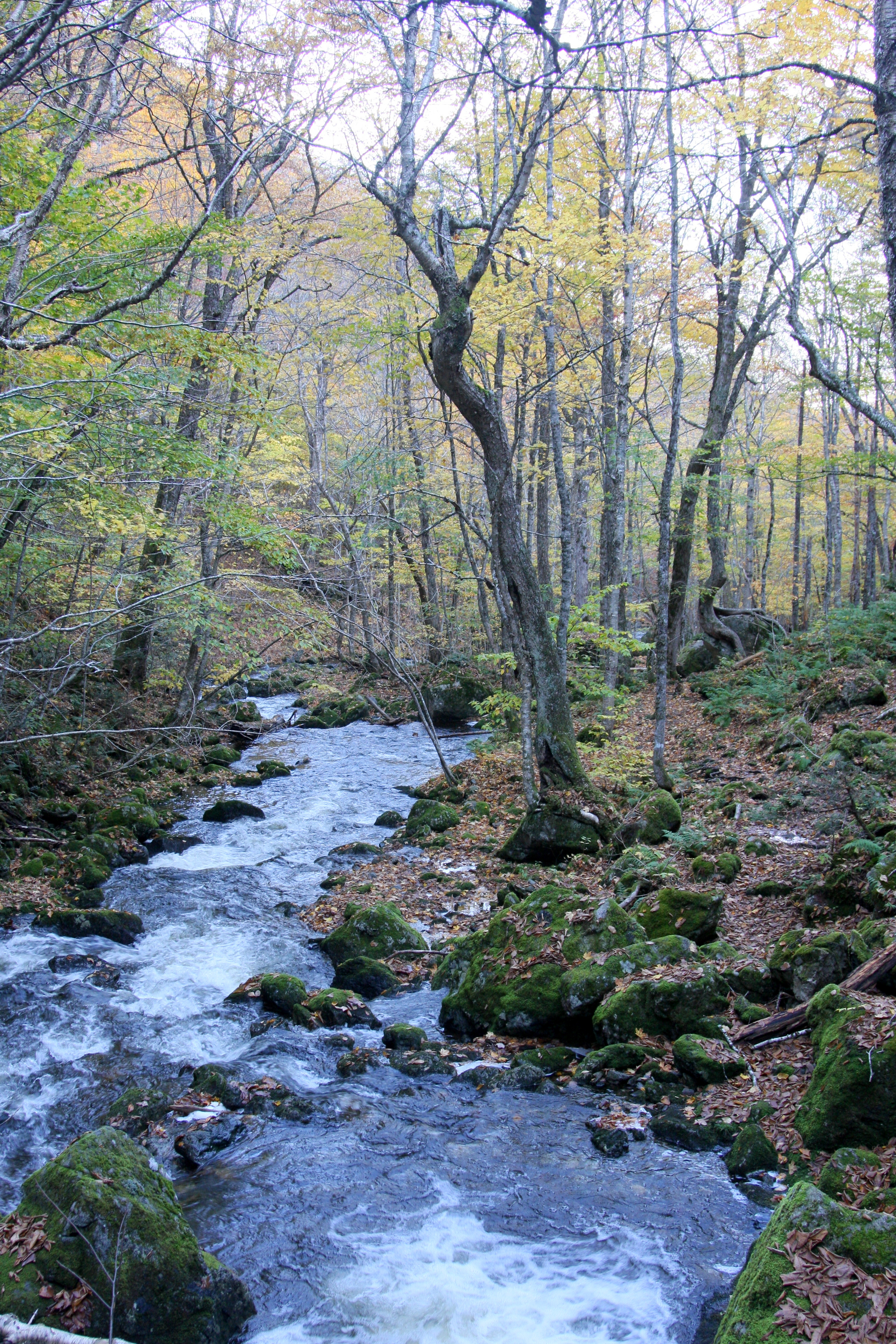
Along the Falls Trail

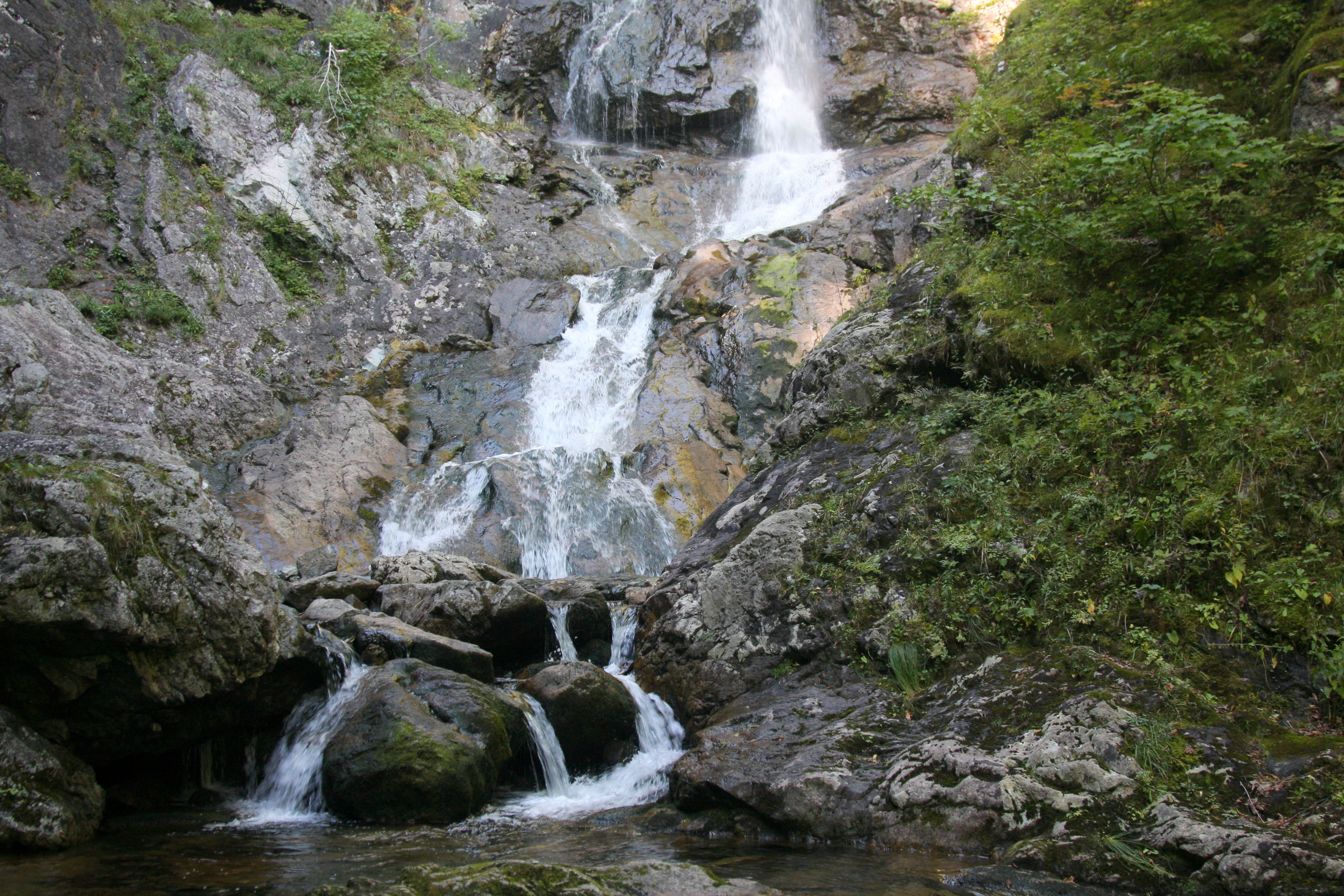
Lower Falls

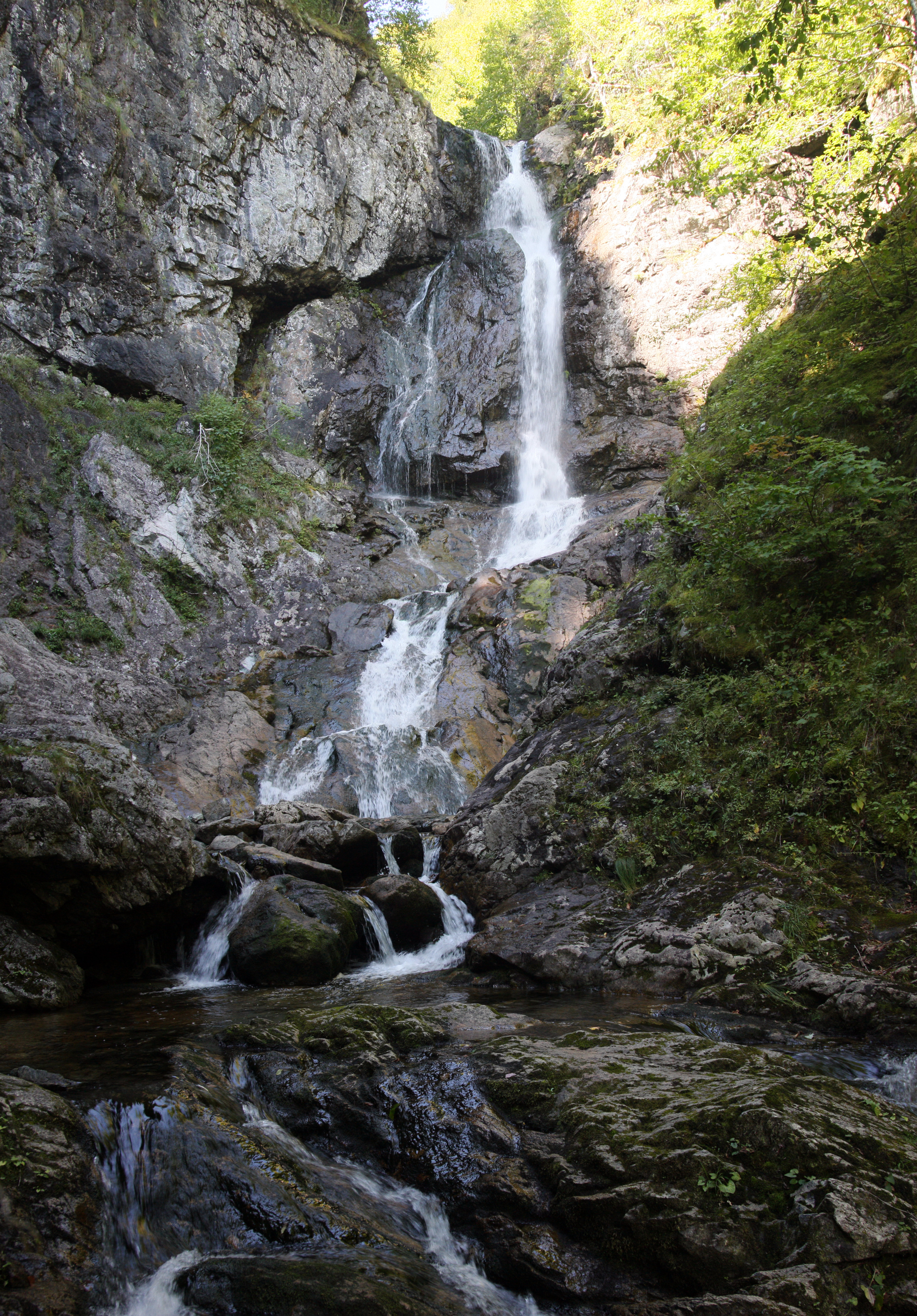
Upper falls at low water

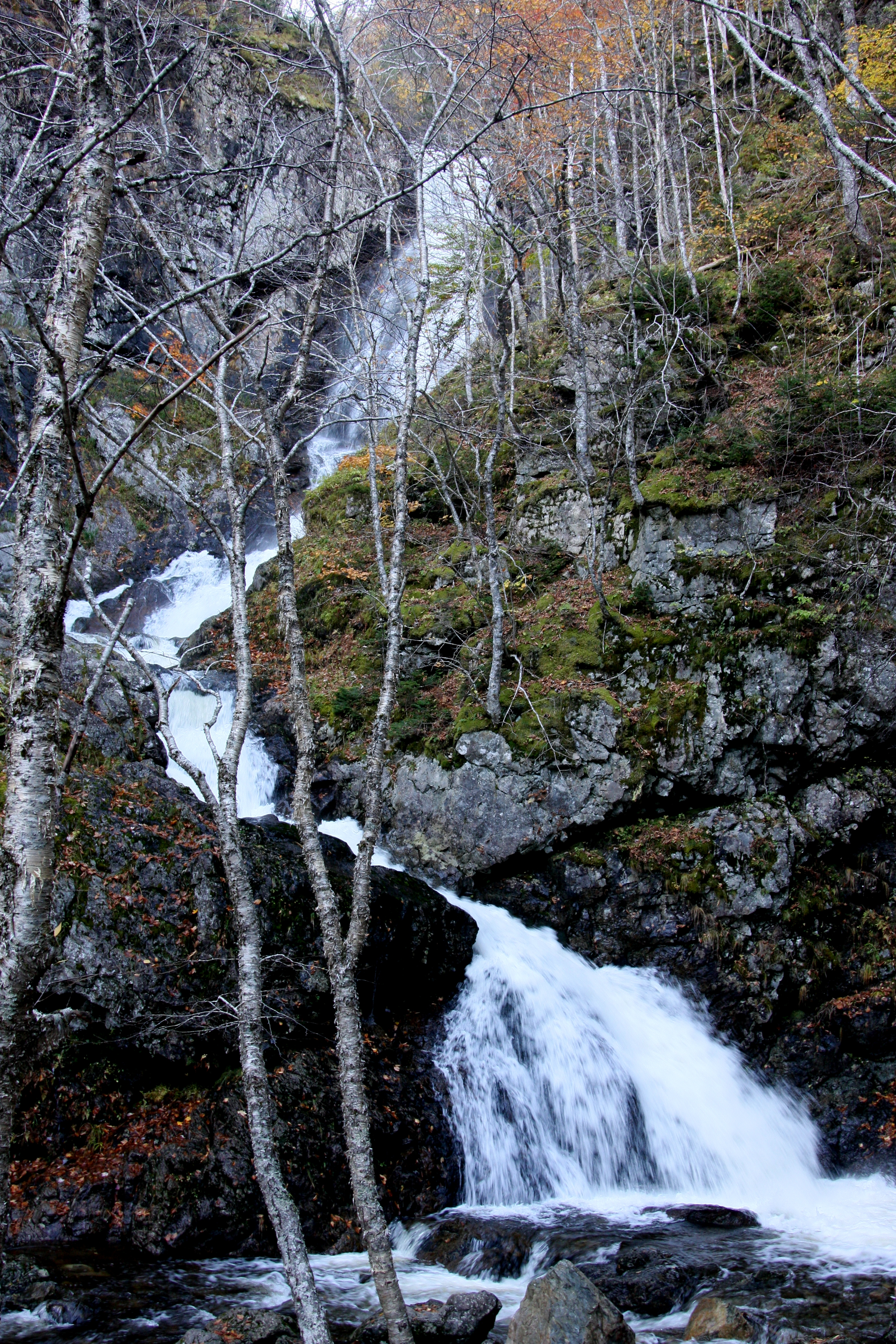
Upper falls in October 2014

== See also ==
- List of waterfalls
- List of waterfalls in Canada
- List of waterfalls in Nova Scotia
