= Scotsville =

Community in Nova Scotia, Canada

Coordinates: 46°11′13.06″N 61°9′25.6″W

Scotsville in Nova Scotia

Scotsville (Scottish Gaelic: Bun na h-Aibhne) is a small community in the Canadian province of Nova Scotia, located in Inverness County on Cape Breton Island.

Scotsville was originally known as "Outlet of Lake Ainslie". The area received the name Scotsville in 1883. The community had a grist mill, two stores, and a school by the 1870s.

Scotville had a population of 214 people in 1956.

== Egypt Falls ==
Egypt Falls (originally Appin Falls), located within the community, is known as a tourist attraction.
