= Still Brook Waterfall =

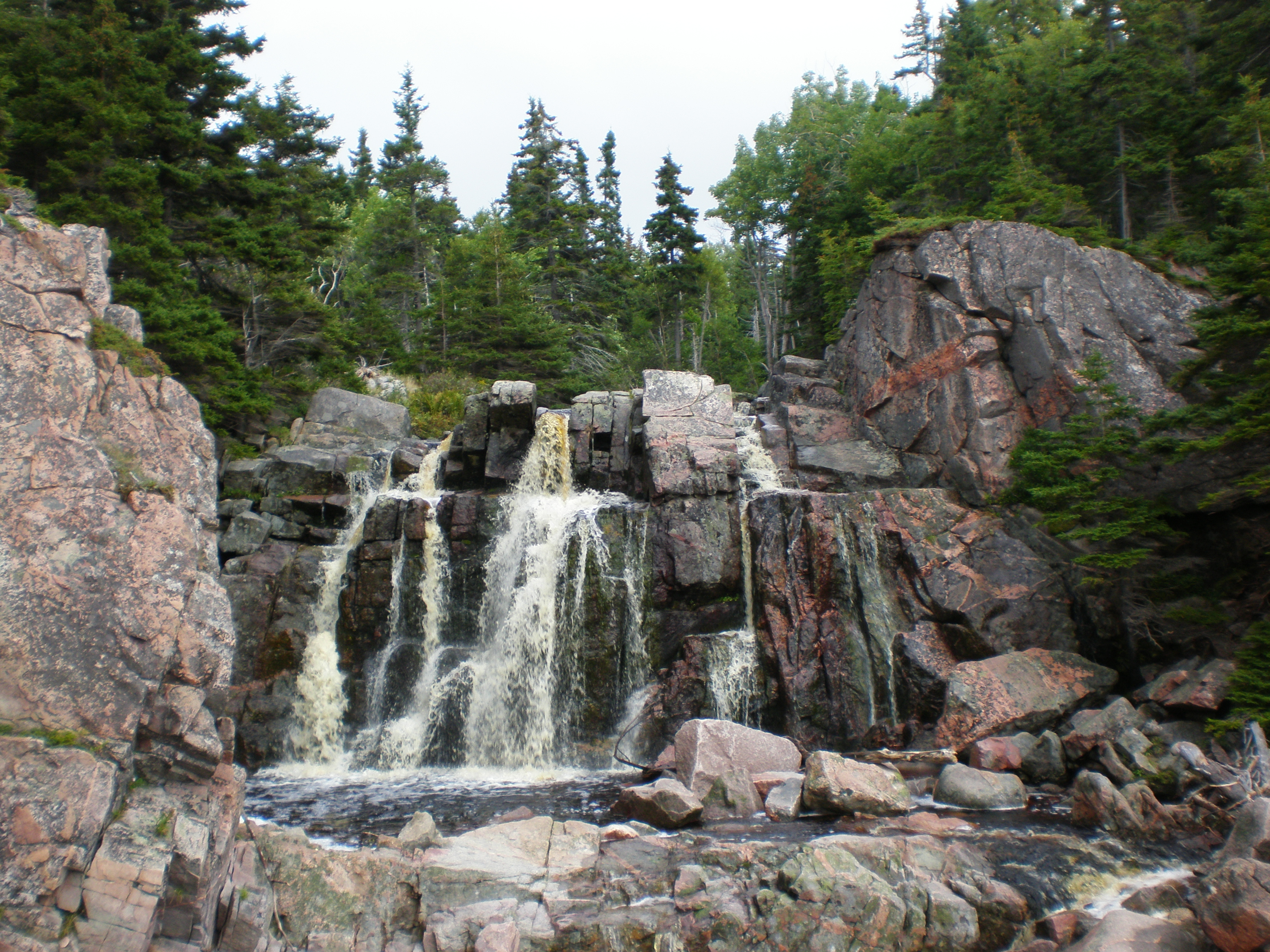
- Interactive map of Still Brook Waterfall
- Location: Cape Breton Highlands National Park, Nova Scotia, Canada
- Coordinates: 46°46′38″N 60°19′55″W
- Type: Segmented cascade
- Watercourse: Still Brook

Still Brook Waterfall is a waterfall at mouth of Still Brook, where the brook empties into Black Brook Cove, and so into the Cabot Strait and the Atlantic Ocean. Still Brook Waterfall flows into Black Brook Cove at the north end of Ringing Beach and Black Brook Beach, a popular swimming and picnic site on the Cabot Trail in the Cape Breton Highlands National Park, 10 kilometres (6 mi) north of Ingonish, Nova Scotia, Canada. The larger Black Brook also enters the cove, at the southern end of the beach.

== See also ==
- List of waterfalls
- List of waterfalls in Canada
- List of waterfalls in Nova Scotia
