= Uisge Ban Falls Provincial Park =

Provincial park in Nova Scotia, Canada

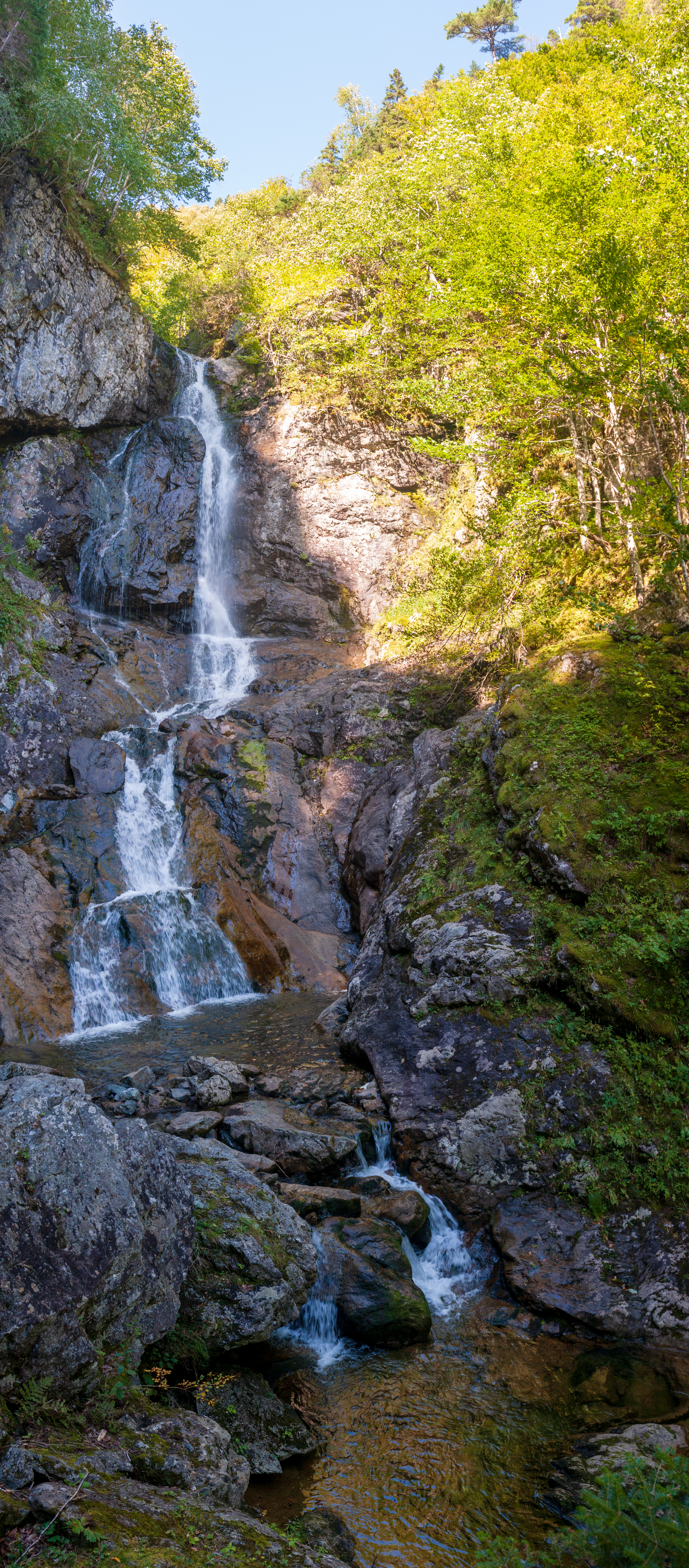
- Uisge Ban Falls
- Interactive map of Uisge Ban Falls Provincial Park
- Type: Provincial Park
- Location: New Glen, Nova Scotia, Canada
- Nearest town: Baddeck, Nova Scotia
- Coordinates: 46°12′10.99″N 60°46′41.84″W
- Area: 147.49 hectares (364.5 acres)
- Operator: Parks and Recreation Division, Nova Scotia Department of Natural Resources
- Open: Dawn to dusk, from May 15 to October 12, no facilities in winter (parking at gate only)
- Status: Undesignated; Operational
- Hiking trails: Falls Trail, River Trail
- Website: Uisage Ban Falls Provincial Park

Uisge Ban Falls Provincial Park is a provincial park near New Glen, in the Canadian province of Nova Scotia on Cape Breton Island. Located on the North Branch Road 14.5 kilometres (9.0 mi) north of Baddeck, the civic address of the park entrance is 715 North Branch Road, Baddeck Forks, Nova Scotia, Canada B0E 1B0.

The name Uisge Ban (alternative spellings 'Easach', 'Bàn' or 'Bahn') comes from the Gaelic meaning “white water”.

This picnic and hiking park is managed by the provincial Department of Natural Resources and contains Easach Ban Falls. This provincial park trail is well-maintained and has interpretive signs and a map at the trailhead. Parking, picnic tables (some with shelters) and vault toilets are on site. The 16-metre-high (52-foot) waterfall is accessible by trail.

== Natural history ==
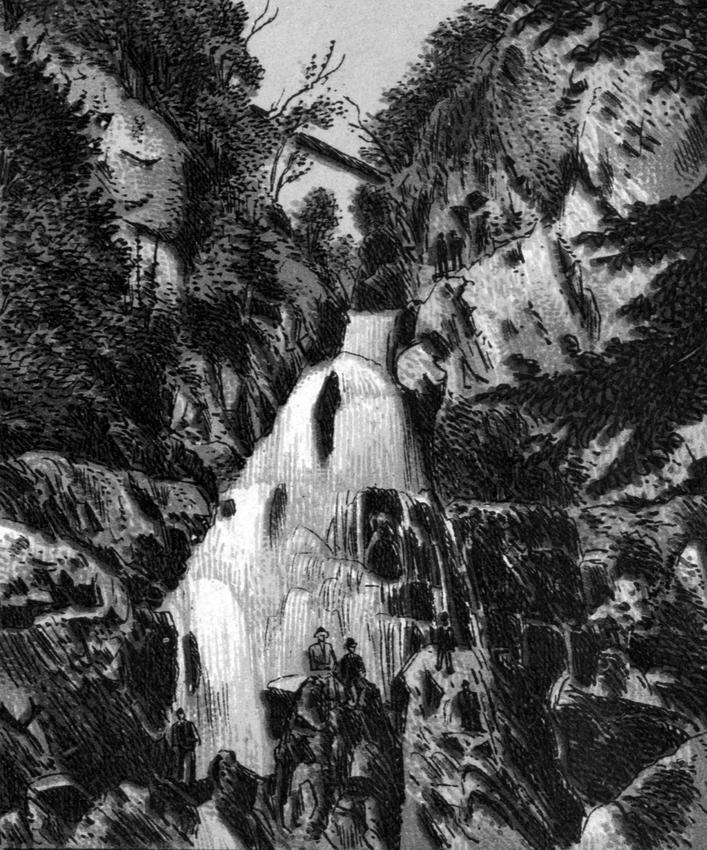
ca. 1900 A scrapbook image of Uisge Ban Falls. Item was donated to the Beaton Institute Archives by Malcolm McNeil of Boston.

=== Geology ===
The landscape surrounding Uisge Ban Falls Provincial Park is a product or incredibly powerful forces which have shaped and reshaped the area over 5 billion years. Formation of the earth's landmass, tremendous volcanic activity, collision of continents, mountain-building, massive erosion and glaciation, have all played a role in shaping this landscape.

Uisge Ban Falls Provincial Park lies in a steep-sided river canyon, part of the landscape which forms the interface between the elevated Cape Breton Boreal Plateau (Taiga) and the lower Central Cape Breton Hills landscapes. Rock types of this landscape are similar to those found in the boreal plateau - derived ancient granites, gneiss, and schists.

Major river systems such as this Baddeck River system, of which Falls Brook / Easach Ban is part, originate on the boreal plateau, plunge down the steep slopes (approximately 300 metres (980 ft) in height), to eventually empty into the Bras d'Or Lakes.

=== Plant life ===
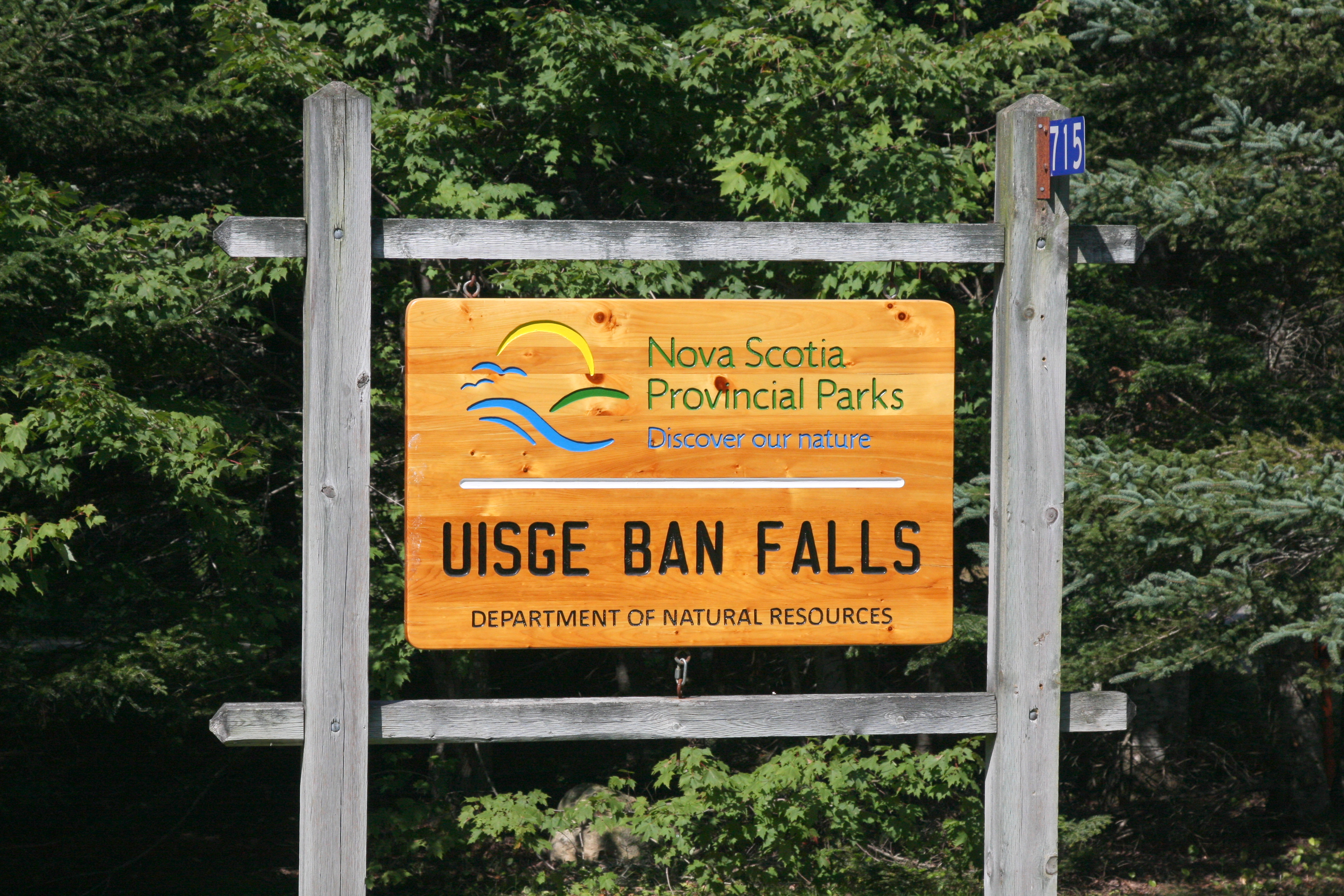
Uisge Ban Falls Provincial Park

The Falls Brook / Easach Ban canyon is filled by deciduous, coniferous, and mixed forests. Dominant tree species include sugar maple, yellow birch, beech, white spruce, and balsam fir. Provincially rare and uncommon plants occur in this canyon.

Streams such as this one overflow their banks from time to time, and in the process, deposit rich alluvial soils along their banks. Although the patches of soil are not extensive, flowers that like the speckled sunlight and rich soils abound throughout the forest floor. Nodding Trilliums, Indian Cucumber, False Solomon's Seal, Clintonia, Starflower, Bunchberry, and False Lily-of-the-Valley are a few of the wild flowers that are indigenous to the floor of the hardwood forest. Small bunches of poisonous red baneberry add to the colour and rich variety of plants.

== The Trails ==
=== The Falls Trail ===
The Falls Trail is approximately 3 kilometres (1.9 mi) in length and requires about one hour to complete. The trail passes through a field then follows Falls Brook upstream through a mixed forest and then a climax hardwood forest composed largely of maple, birch, and beech. The deep stream valley narrows dramatically in the vicinity of Easach Ban Waterfall. At the falls, the sheer walls of the gorge tower 150 metres (490 ft) on either side.

The original trail was developed with assistance from the Nova Scotia Forest Technicians Association. Recent improvements were undertaken by Stora Enso and the Nova Scotia Department of Natural Resources.

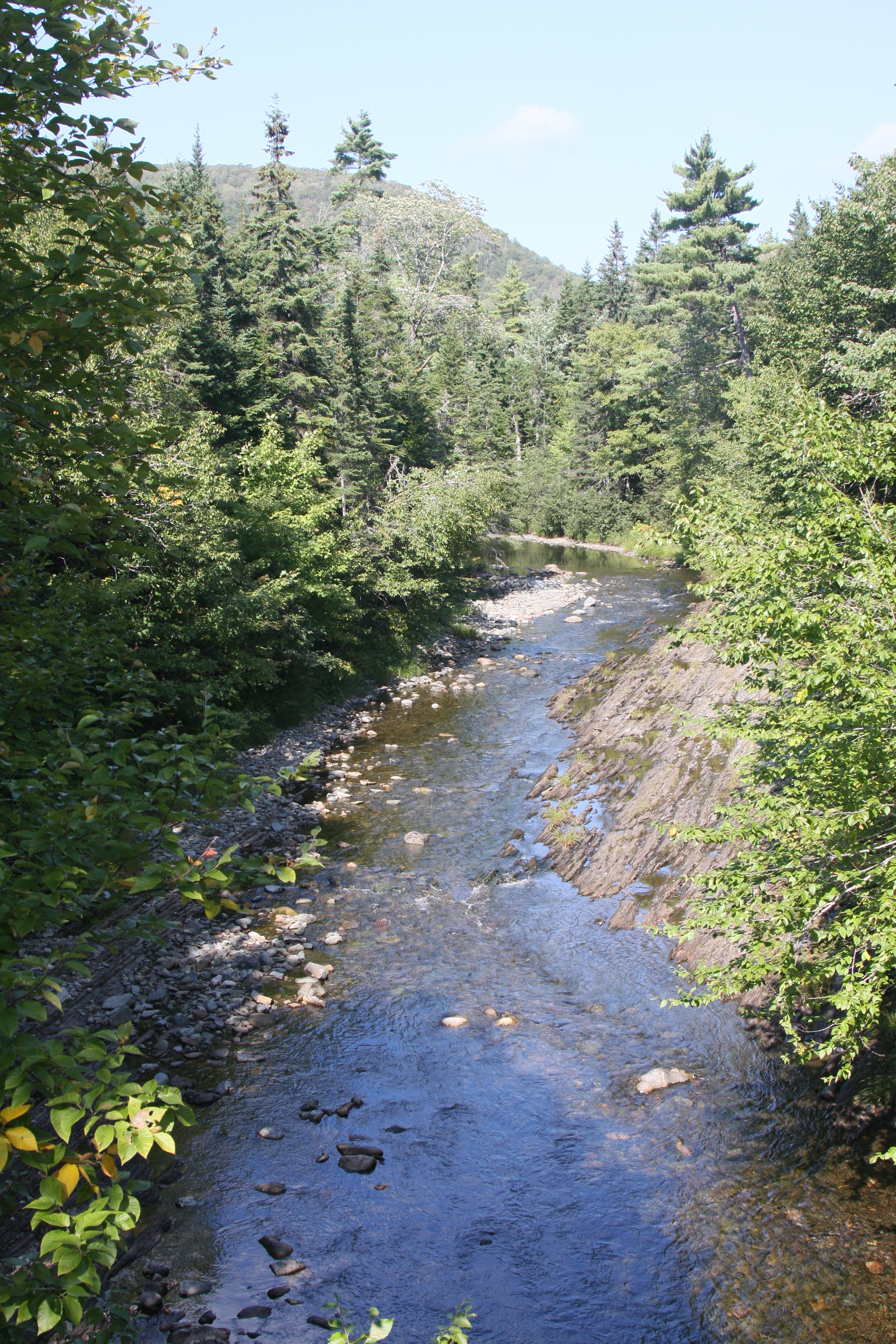
Along the River Trail

=== The River Trail ===
Another trail in the park, The River Trail branches off of the Falls Trail and proceeds north from Falls Brook. It is about 3 kilometres (1.9 mi) in length (return) and requires about one hour to travel. Following along the banks of the North Branch Baddeck River, the trail winds through a climax sugar maple, yellow birch, beech forest at the foot of the river valley's steep slope. Many of the trees in this area are over 100 years old.

=== Above the falls ===
For the adventurous, another falls, about 10 metres (33 ft) in size, exists a further 1.5 kilometres (0.93 mi) upstream from Easach Ban Falls. Continue hiking up along the side of the brook (no trail exists).

Access to the top of the ridge above the falls can be had several hundred meters back downstream, be cautious around the high cliffs around this location.

== Geocache ==
There are a number of geocaches in Uisge Ban Falls Provincial Park, near the park entrance, along the Northern Long Trail (River Trail) to the Uisge Ban Falls, and in the area of the falls itself.

== Season & fees ==
The park is open for day use (from dawn to dusk), from May 15 to October 12. There are no facilities in winter (parking at gate only). There is no charge for using the park and its facilities.
