= Scottville =

Scottville may refer to:

- Scottville, Queensland, in Australia
- Scottville, Illinois, in the United States
- Scottsville, Kentucky, in the United States, originally known as Scottville
- Scottville, Michigan, in the United States
- Scottville, North Carolina, in the United States
- Scottville, Virginia, in the United States (former name for Powhatan, Virginia)

== See also ==
- Scottsville (disambiguation)
