= Egypt Falls =

Waterfall in Nova Scotia, Canada

Coordinates: 46.1931°N 61.1256°W

Egypt Falls (MacFarlane Falls) also known as Appin Falls, the Curtains and Piper's Glen Falls, is a waterfall located in the Municipality of the County of Inverness, Nova Scotia, Canada. The waterfall and the trail leading up to it are one of the most popular hiking spots in Cape Breton. Work on the trail is being done to make it more accessible and less dangerous. The trail is located on private property.
