= Glassmine Falls =

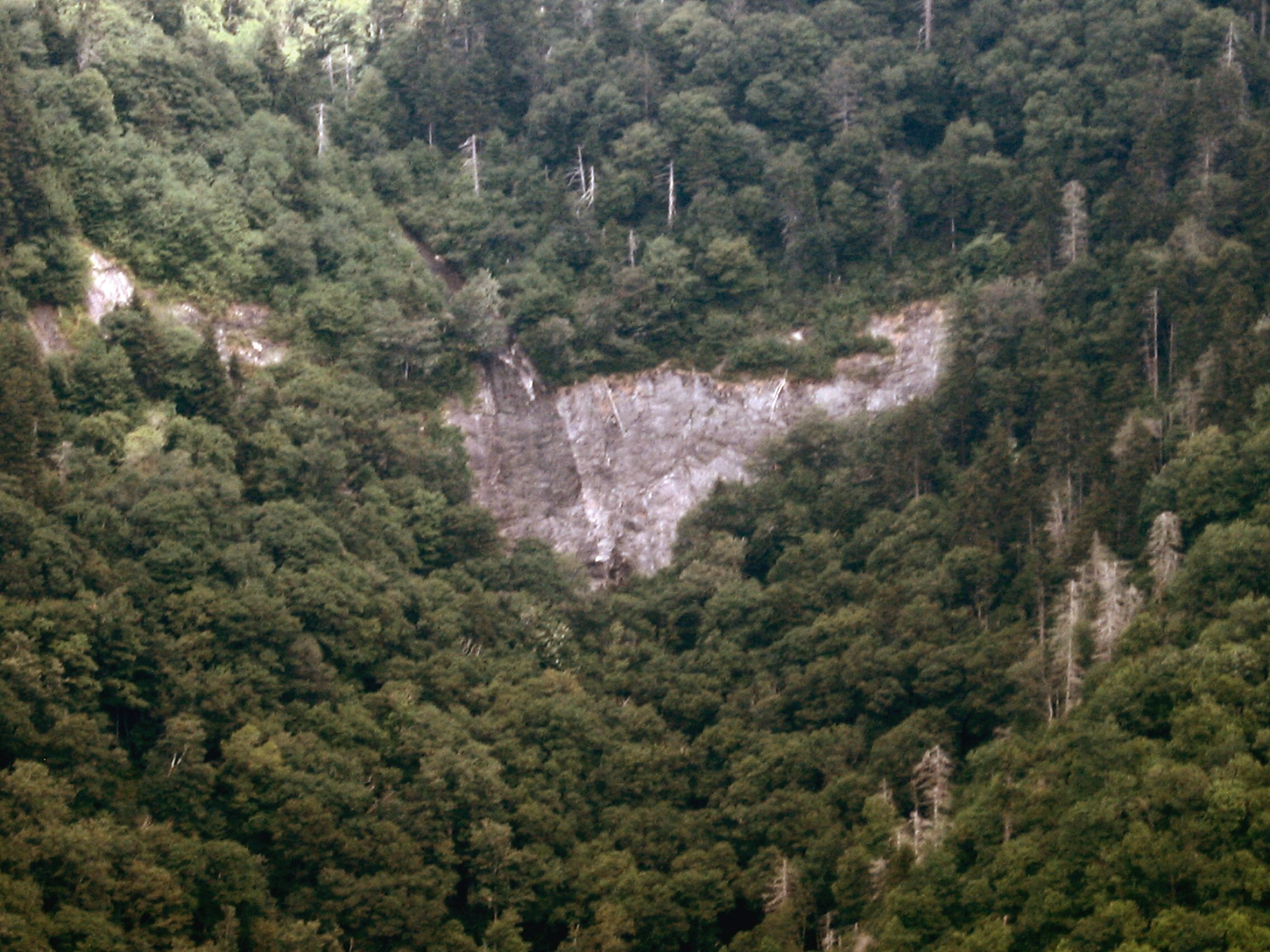
- Visible portion of Glassmine Falls, August 2006
- Interactive map of Glassmine Falls
- Location: Buncombe County, in the Blue Ridge Mountains of North Carolina
- Coordinates: 35.735333°N 82.331550°W
- Type: Slide
- Total height: >800 ft (240 m) (estimated)

Glassmine Falls is an ephemeral waterfall in Buncombe County, North Carolina, on Glassmine Branch, near Barnardsville, NC. It is located below the Blue Ridge Parkway around milepost 362.

== Geology ==
When it flows, the falls slides down the rock face of Blackstock Knob Mountain down to the North Fork Swannanoa River. The flow is not constant and can sometimes nearly dry up completely. It is most visible after heavy rains, which can be at any time during the year. A sign at the overlook for the falls claims that the falls is over 800 ft (247m) high, although the actual height is probably much less, possibly around 200 feet.

== History ==
At the base of the falls is the old Abernathy Mine, a mica mine. The miners referred to the mineral they mined as "glass", which is how the falls got its name.

== Visiting the falls ==
Access to the falls is restricted to a viewing platform at milemarker 361.2 on the Blue Ridge Parkway. The falls is directly in the City of Asheville's watershed, so direct access to the falls is strictly prohibited.

== Nearby falls ==
- Walker Falls
- Douglas Falls
- Mitchell Falls
- Setrock Creek Falls
- Roaring Fork Falls
- Whiteoak Creek Falls

== See also ==
- List of waterfalls
- List of waterfalls in North Carolina
