= Whiteoak Creek Falls =

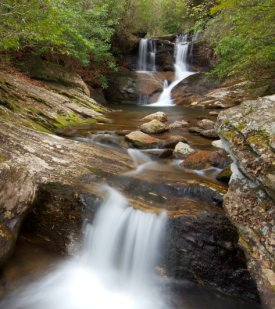
- Interactive map of Whiteoak Creek Falls
- Location: Pisgah National Forest, Yancey County, in the Blue Ridge Mountains of North Carolina
- Coordinates: 35.82682°N 82.21987°W
- Type: Cascade, Slide
- Total height: 20 feet (6 m)

Whiteoak Creek Falls, is a waterfall in the Pisgah National Forest, in North Carolina.

== Geology ==
The falls is located on Whiteoak Creek, a tributary of the South Toe River, which itself is a tributary of the North Toe River.

== Height ==
There are multiple cascades, slides and drops. The largest single drop is probably only around 20' but taken as a whole the entire section probably covers 80'+

== Visiting the falls ==
From the intersection of the Blue Ridge Parkway and Hwy 80, drive north on Hwy 80. At 2.2 miles is the left hand turn to Roaring Fork and Setrock Creek Falls (South Toe River Rd). Continue past there on Hwy 80, drive just over 5 miles and turn left on White Oak Rd (SR1156). Drive another 1/2 mile or so and turn left on White Oak Creek Rd (SR1157). This road dead ends after another 1.5 miles. Park here and walk up the old logging road and look for some side paths down to the base.

As of July 19, 2009, during a recent windstorm, a large tree has fallen into the creek between the lower and upper cascades, meaning you can't see the upper portion from the lower portion of the falls.

== Nearby falls ==
- Roaring Fork Falls
- Setrock Creek Falls
- Mitchell Falls
- Douglas Falls
- Walker Falls
- Crabtree Falls

== See also ==
- List of waterfalls
- List of waterfalls in North Carolina
