= Sliding Rock =

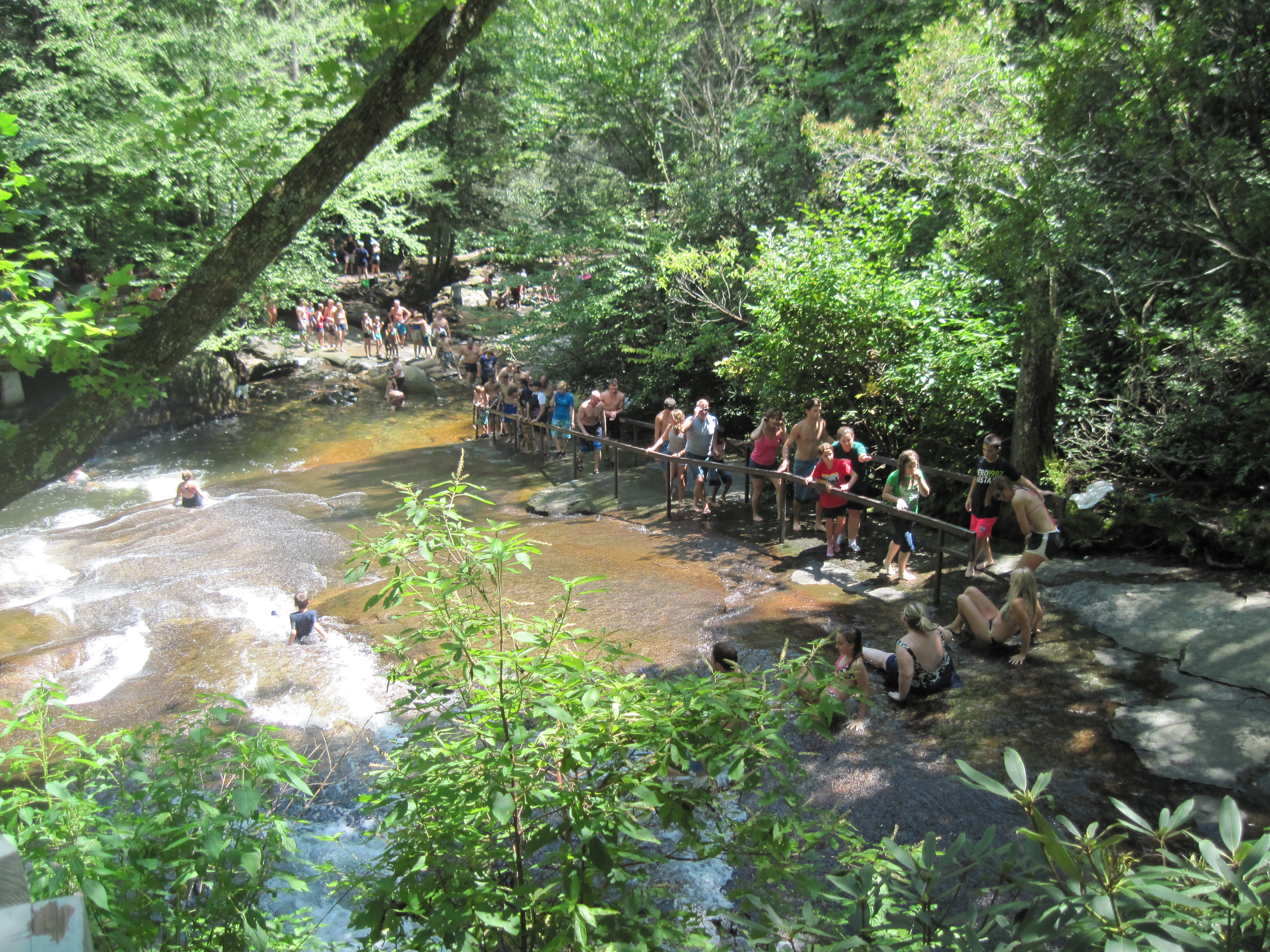
- View of swimmers on Sliding Rock from the Overlook, looking towards the Plunge Pool
- Interactive map of Sliding Rock
- Location: Pisgah National Forest, Transylvania County, North Carolina
- Coordinates: 35.311021°N 82.787252°W
- Type: Slide
- Total height: 60 ft (18.3 m)
- Number of drops: 1

Sliding Rock is a waterfall in Western North Carolina, located near Brevard, so named because visitors can slide all the way down the waterfall into the plunge pool below. The plunge pool is around 8 feet deep in the middle, with a strong churning river current, so users must be able to swim or wear a life vest. The water in the river and the plunge pool remains near 55 degrees Fahrenheit year round. Sliding Rock is a small slide-type waterfall on Looking Glass Creek, in the Pisgah National Forest, near Brevard, North Carolina. It has a gentle slope and is about 60 feet long, ending in a large, deep pool (between 6–8 feet deep) at the bottom.

== Visiting the Falls ==
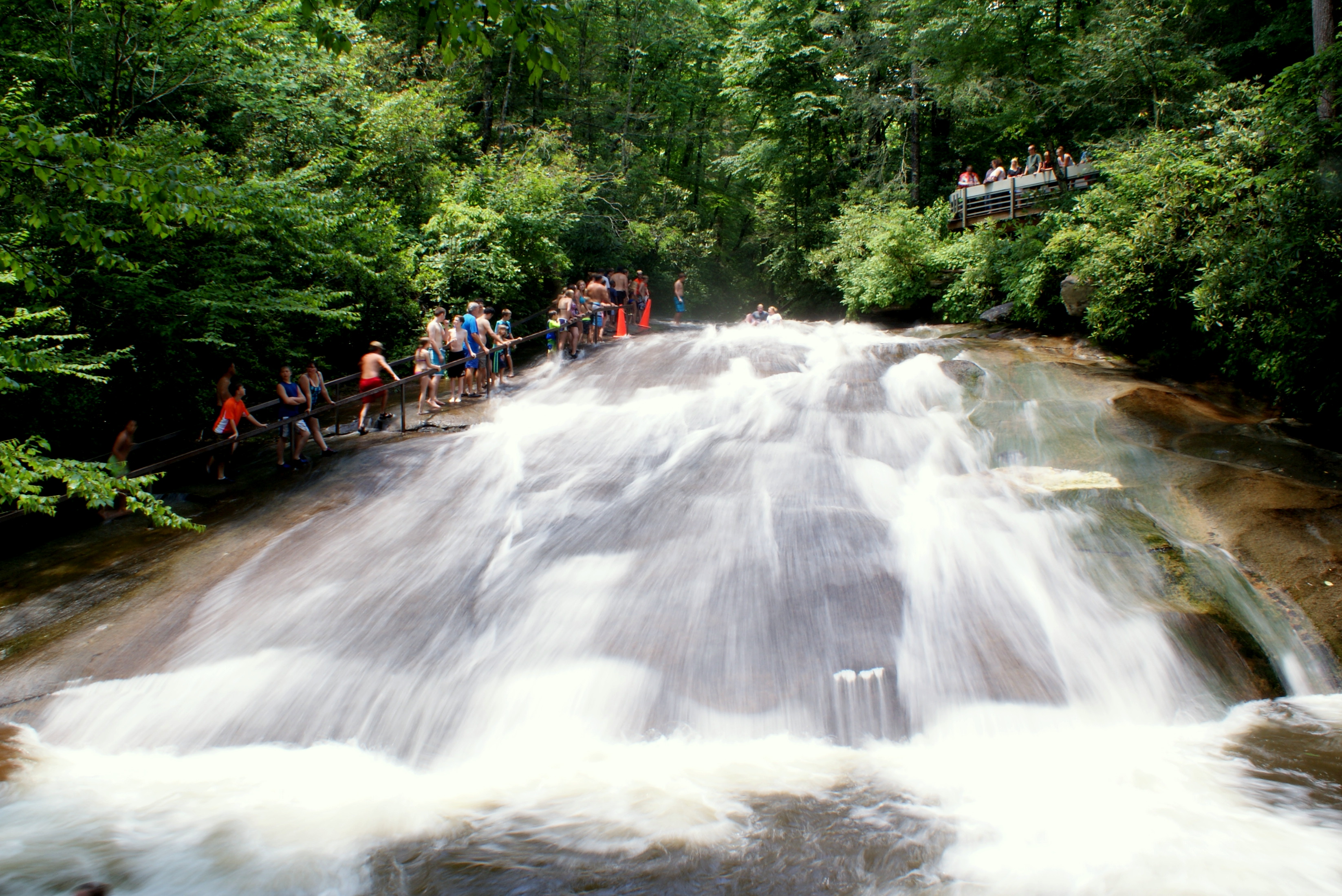
People in line to slide down the rock

The rock has long been used as a natural water slide for adventurous tourists and locals. The water is very cold, approximately 55 degrees Fahrenheit, and is popular for cooling off in the summer.

The area has been developed by the US Forest Service into a popular recreation area. The area is currently being managed by a company called Adventure Pisgah (formerly known as Pisgah Hospitality Partners) which provides staffing for Sliding Rock as well as numerous other recreational sites and campgrounds in the region. Parking is available in a large lot above the rock and beside U.S. Highway 276. When the lot is full during busy summer hours, staff will temporarily close the parking lot and direct traffic away while visitors must wait for the lot to reopen. There is one viewing platform (the second, lower platform was destroyed by a rain storm and subsequent flooding of the river in summer of 2021). There are steps down to the pool and a railing to help climb the rock on the left side before sliding down. Sliding down is allowed in an upright sitting position only. Visitors may only slide if they are able to swim and tread water, because the pool at the bottom of the slide is 8 feet deep. Non-swimmers are required to wear Coast Guard-approved floatation devices in order to slide. Pool noodles, inner tubes, inflatable water wings, and other non-Coast Guard-approved floats are not to be used. A restroom and changing room is provided during staffed hours, and a staff of lifeguards are periodically on duty: Sliding Rock is staffed full-time especially throughout the busiest part of summer, and on weekends early and late in the summer season. At other times, sliding down the waterfall is done at a visitor's own risk. Children must be of a certain age to slide alone, otherwise, they may slide with the assistance of a competent adult.

A $5.00 per person fee is charged by Forest Service to access the area between Memorial Day and Labor Day weekends, when lifeguards are present and other staff are on duty maintaining bathrooms, keeping the facility and park clean, and providing access to emergency services. The entry fee is half-price ($2.50) when non-aquatic staff are on duty, but no lifeguards are on duty. During these times, visitors may slide at their own risk. However, the rock is always closed to sliders during times of high water, dangerous weather, or when thunder/lightning is detected in the area.

To get to the recreation area and the falls, travel north from the intersection of U.S. Highway 276, approximately 7.7 miles north of the intersection of 276, U.S. Highway 64, and NC Highway 280 in Pisgah Forest, North Carolina. En route, you will pass Looking Glass Falls and the parking area for Moore Cove Falls.

== Nearby falls ==
- Slick Rock Falls
- Moore Cove Falls
- Looking Glass Falls
- Cedar Rock Falls
- Cove Creek Falls
- Daniel Ridge Falls
- Twin Falls
- Log Hollow Falls
- Falls on Log Hollow Branch
- Key Falls

== See also ==
- List of waterfalls
- List of waterfalls in North Carolina
