= Cedar Rock =

Cedar Rock may be:

- Cedar Rock State Park
- Cedar Rock Falls
- Cedar Rock Creek
- Cedar Rock, North Carolina
- Cedar Rock Mountain
