= Cedar Rock Falls =

Cedar Rock Creek Falls
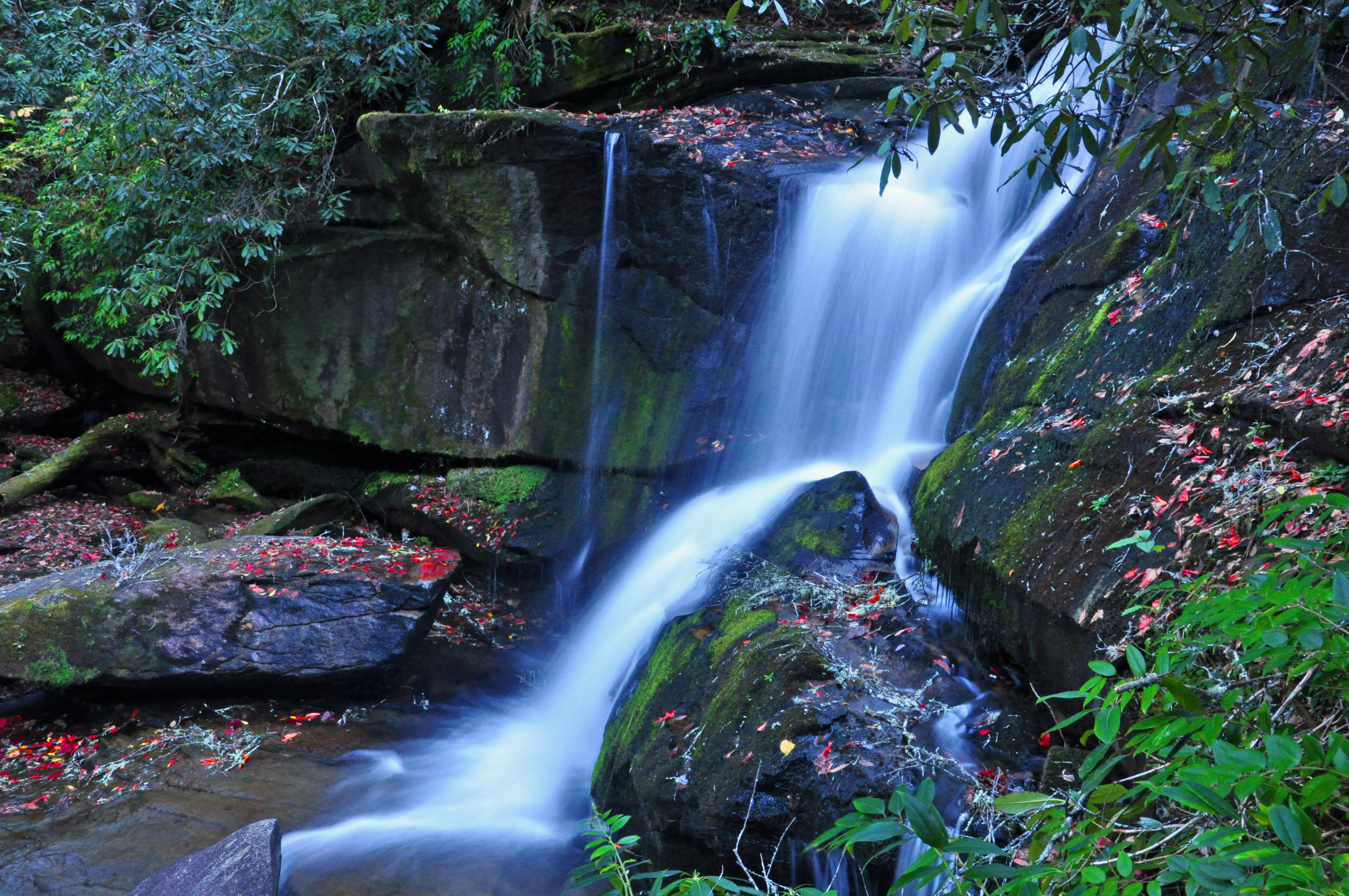
- Cedar Rock Creek Falls
- Interactive map of Cedar Rock Creek Falls
- Location: Pisgah National Forest, Transylvania County, in the Blue Ridge Mountains of North Carolina
- Coordinates: 35.278110°N 82.799697°W
- Type: Cascade
- Total height: 20 ft (6.1 m)
- Number of drops: 1
- Longest drop: 20 ft (6.1 m)

Cedar Rock Falls (Cedar Rock Creek Falls, Falls on Cedar Rock Creek) is a waterfall in Transylvania County, North Carolina, USA.

== Geology ==
Cedar Rock Falls is a 20' waterfall located on Cedar Rock Creek, near the Pisgah Center for Wildlife Education and Fish Hatchery in Pisgah National Forest, North Carolina. It is located downstream of the junction of Cedar Rock and Grogan Creeks. The junction lies in a small, flat valley plateau known as Picklesimer Fields. The combined stream, called Cedar Rock Creek, flows from this plateau over a series of falls and cascades.

== Features ==
The falls is located in an area rich with mosses, eastern hemlock, and Rosebay Rhododendron. A rich spray-cliff plant community exists behind the falls, in the microclimate which is moderated by the falling water and spray mist.

== Visiting the Falls ==
From the intersection of U.S. Highway 276, U.S. Highway 64, and NC Highway 280 in Brevard, North Carolina, travel north for 5.2 miles and head west of Forest Road 475, traveling 1.5 miles to the trailhead at the fish hatchery. The 0.81 mile moderate-difficulty trail follows the Cat Gap Loop trail.

== Nearby falls ==
- Grogan Creek Falls
- Looking Glass Falls
- Slick Rock Falls
- Moore Cove Falls
- Sliding Rock
- Log Hollow Falls
- Falls on Log Hollow Branch

== See also ==
- List of waterfalls
- List of waterfalls in North Carolina
