= Douglas Falls =

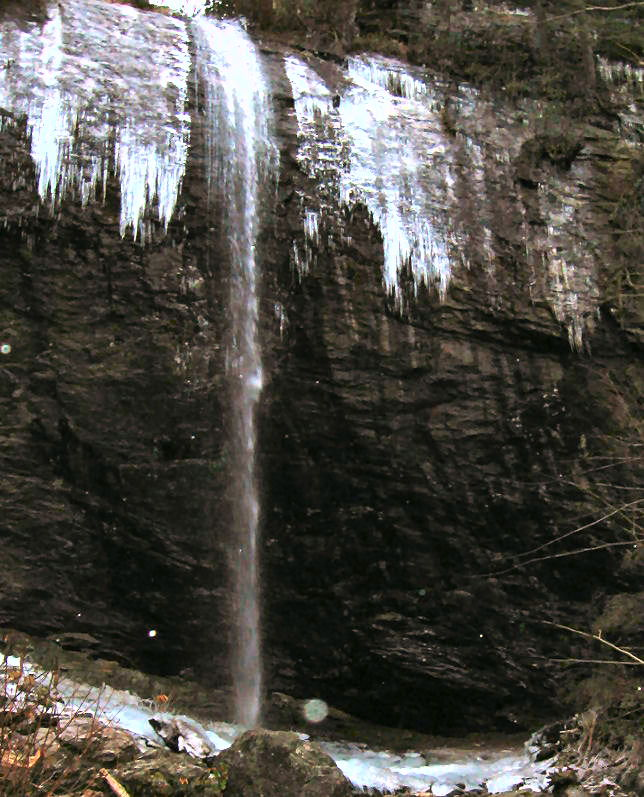
- Interactive map of Douglas Falls
- Location: Blue Ridge Mountains, Buncombe County, North Carolina
- Coordinates: 35.726472°N 82.379569°W
- Type: Plunge
- Total height: 70 ft (21 m)
- Number of drops: 1

Douglas Falls are a 60-foot waterfall located in Buncombe County, North Carolina, United States. It is on a tributary of Waterfall Creek which flows into the Ivy River, and it is within the Big Ivy section of the Pisgah National Forest. The stream flows off the slope of Craggy Pinnacle, starting just below the Blue Ridge Parkway. It is surrounded by a forest of very large Eastern Hemlock trees, which are dead following attack by the Hemlock Wooly Adelgid. Visitors should be very careful when visiting this falls, as the dead Hemlocks will start to decay and fall within the next few years.

== Natural history ==
The falls are located on a tributary of Waterfall Creek, which eventually flows into Carter Creek.

== History ==
Douglas Falls was supposedly named for William O. Douglas, a Supreme Court Justice and author of Of Men and Mountains: The Classic Memoir of Wilderness Adventure.

== Visiting the falls ==
The trail to the falls is located at the far end of a parking lot 4.7 miles from Walker Falls on F.R. 74. Visitors may follow a 0.55 mile path to the base of the falls. The trail continues up the mountain and becomes difficult after reaching the falls, eventually connecting with the Mountains to Sea Trail just below Craggy Pinnacle. From there, hikers can go in either direction to reach the Parkway; going right takes leads to the Craggy Gardens Visitor Center. Many hikers hike down to Douglas Falls from there.

== Nearby falls ==
- Cascades Waterfall - 1.4 miles further down the trail from Douglas Falls, the trail crosses Waterfall Creek at Cascades Waterfall, a steep sliding waterfall above and below the trail. Visitors are encouraged to be extremely careful, since the crossing is extremely dangerous. It is generally regarded as not worth the hike just to see the other falls, but the other scenery along the trail and a connection to the Blue Ridge Parkway makes it see some use. Very large trees grow along this section of trail.
- Walker Falls
- Glassmine Falls
- Mitchell Falls
- Setrock Creek Falls
- Roaring Fork Falls
- Whiteoak Creek Falls

== See also ==
- List of waterfalls
- List of waterfalls in North Carolina
- Blackwater River (West Virginia), a tributary of which also has a "Douglas Falls"
