= Slick Rock Falls =

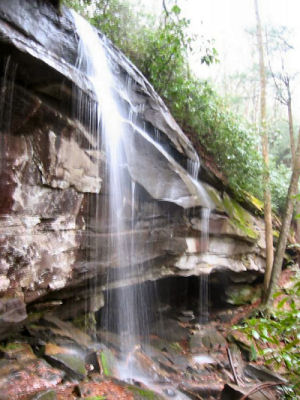
- Slick Rock Falls, March 2007
- Interactive map of Slick Rock Falls
- Location: Pisgah National Forest, Transylvania County, North Carolina
- Coordinates: 35.293441°N 82.797109°W
- Type: Plunge
- Total height: 30 ft (9 m)
- Number of drops: 1

Slick Rock Falls is a waterfall in Western North Carolina, located near Brevard.

== Geology ==
Slick Rock Falls flows on Slick Rock Creek over an overhanging bluff. The falls occasionally dries to a near-trickle, depending on the available watershed.

== Natural history ==
The falls are named after the slick rocks at the top and bottom of the falls. Before becoming a part of the Pisgah National Forest, a cattle trail crossed Slick Rock Creek near the top of the falls, and occasionally, a stray animal would be carried over the falls.

== Visiting the Falls ==
The falls are open to the public and are accessible by traveling on U.S. Highway 276, approximately 5.2 miles north of the intersection of 276, U.S. Highway 64, and NC Highway 280 in Brevard, North Carolina. Turn left onto Forest Road 475 and go 1.5 miles, and turn right onto Forest Road 475B. Go north 1.1 miles. You will come to a sharp left-hand curve with a small pullout on the outside of the curve. Park here and follow the trail for 55 yards, taking the right fork to the base of the falls in approximately 45 yards.

== Nearby falls ==
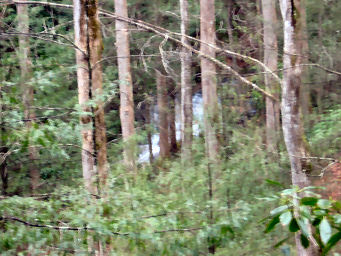
Rockhouse Creek Falls

Approximately .5 miles (.9 km) north of Slick Rock Falls on Forest Road 475B is Rockhouse Creek Falls. It is almost impossible to view the falls anytime other than winter, due to a thick forest of rhododendron, mountain laurel, and dog hobble. There is no trail of any kind to the falls, and exploring this area is extremely hazardous.

- Rockhouse Creek Falls
- Looking Glass Falls
- Moore Cove Falls
- Sliding Rock
- Cedar Rock Falls
- Cove Creek Falls
- Daniel Ridge Falls
- Twin Falls
- Log Hollow Falls
- Falls on Log Hollow Branch
- Key Falls

== See also ==
- List of waterfalls
- List of waterfalls in North Carolina
