= Looking Glass Falls =

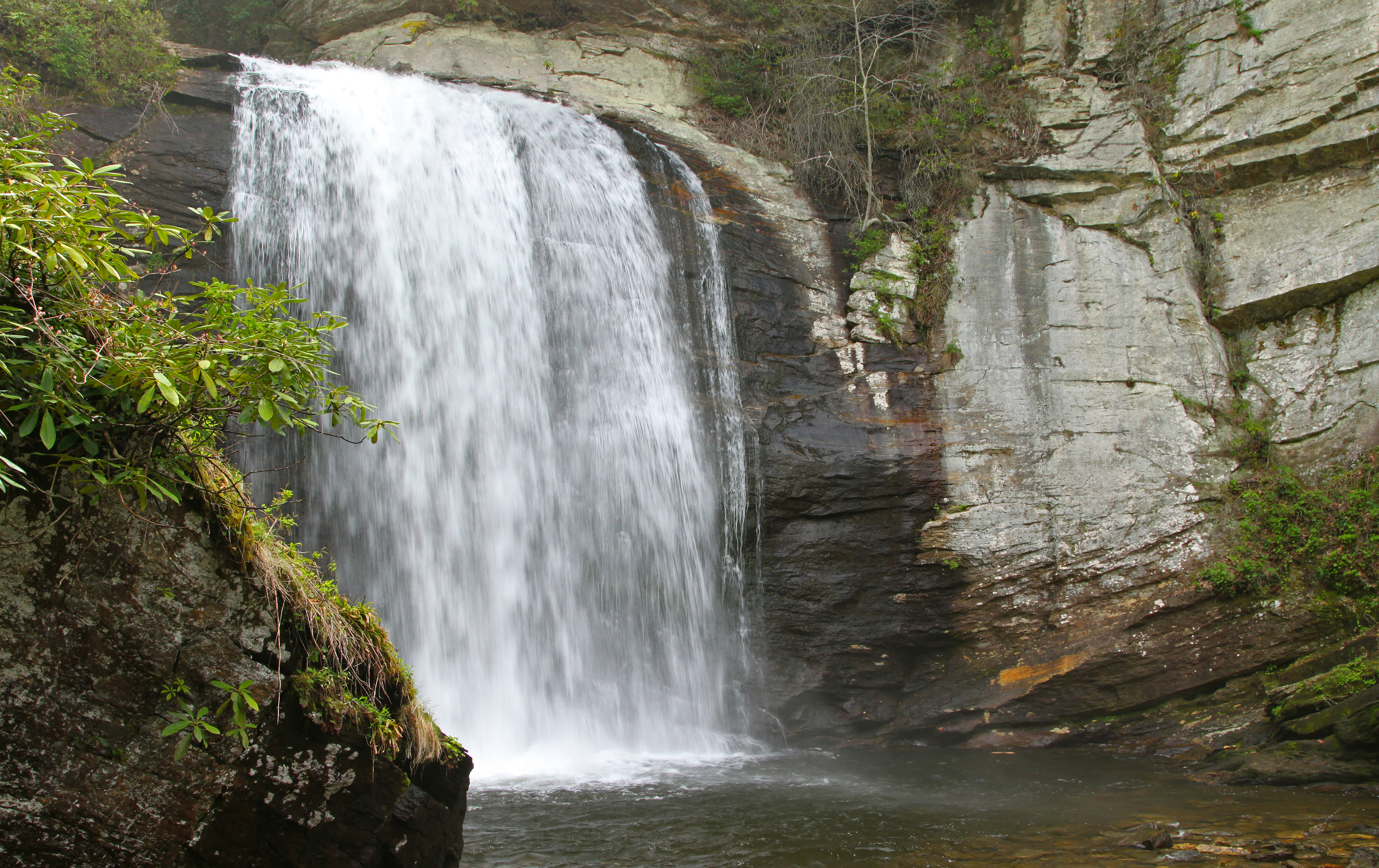
- View of Looking Glass Falls from the creekbed, March 2012
- Interactive map of Looking Glass Falls
- Location: Pisgah National Forest, Transylvania county, NC, North Carolina
- Coordinates: 35.296338°N 82.768399°W
- Type: Plunge
- Total height: 60 ft (18.3 m)
- Number of drops: 1

Recording of Looking Glass Falls in early summer

Looking Glass Falls is a waterfall in Western North Carolina, located near Brevard.

== Natural history ==
The name comes from nearby Looking Glass Rock, which resembles a wintertime mirror (or "looking glass") of sunlight, as water freezes on its sides and reflects the sun, and from the name of the stream from which the falls plunge, Looking Glass Creek.

== Geology ==
The waterway is Looking Glass Creek, which flows through the Pisgah National Forest.

== Visiting the Falls ==
The falls are open to the public and are accessible on the side of U.S. Highway 276, approximately 5.6 miles north of the intersection of 276, U.S. Highway 64, and NC Highway 280 in Pisgah Forest, North Carolina. The falls are just under 70' tall from top to bottom, with the main falls at 60'. It is an extremely popular waterfall, due to ease of access to the falls directly on the side of the road. There is a path that leads to the plunge pool. During the winter when the falls freeze solid, they are popular Ice Climbing destination.

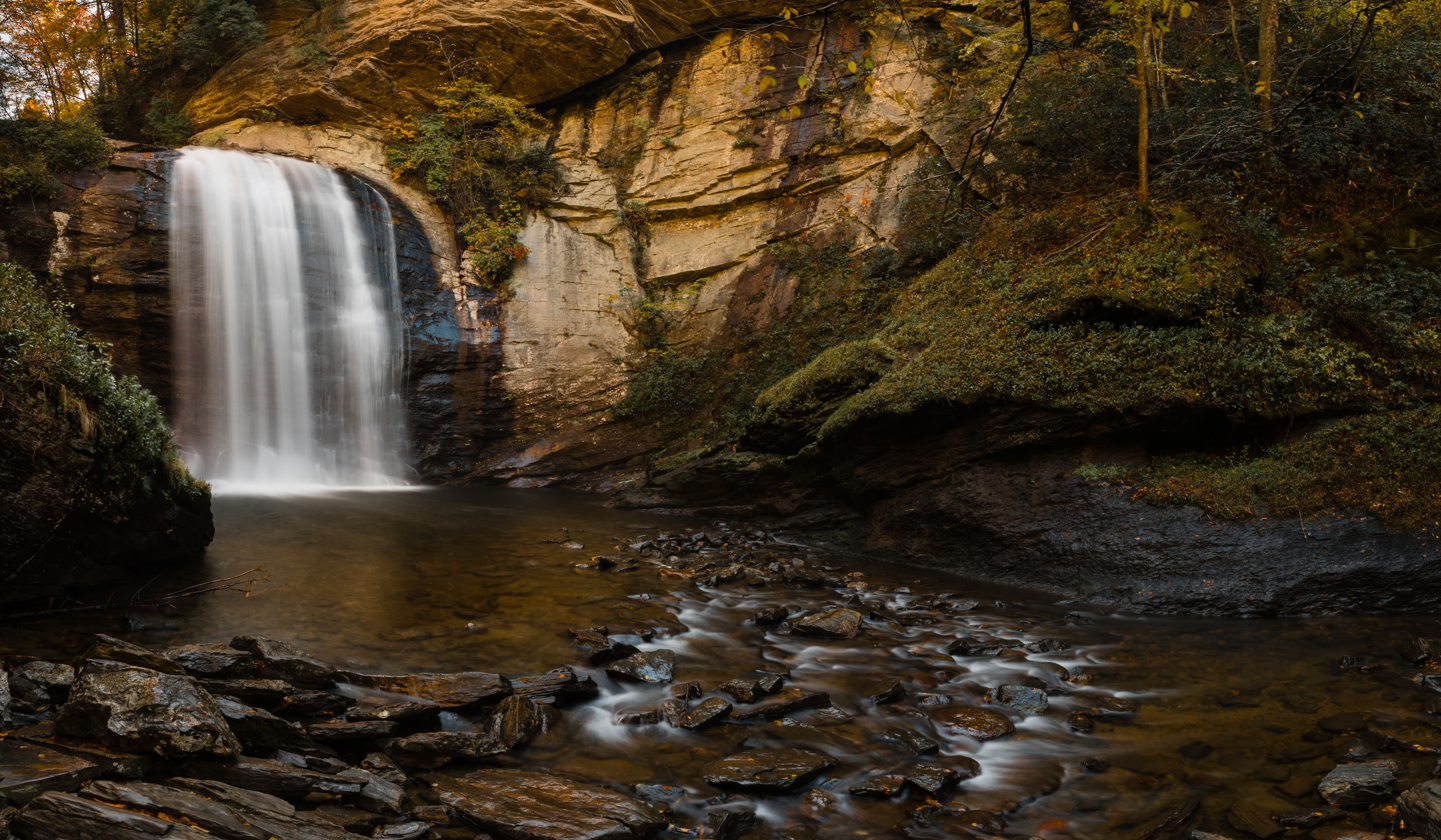
Looking Glass Falls in Autumn

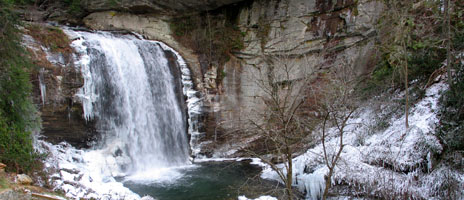
Wintertime view of Looking Glass Falls

According to local Emergency Services personnel, there have been many injuries and deaths at the falls, mainly due to individuals who rock climb near the edge of the falls and accidentally fall in the plunge pool, or persons who jump in the plunge pool. In 1990, South African kayaker Corran Addison kayaked over the falls successfully, but injured his back in the process. Persons who visit Looking Glass Falls should take care to respect both basic safety rules and the fragile environment that exist at the falls.

== Nearby falls ==
- Slick Rock Falls
- Moore Cove Falls
- Sliding Rock
- Cedar Rock Falls
- Cove Creek Falls
- Daniel Ridge Falls
- Twin Falls
- Log Hollow Falls
- Falls on Log Hollow Branch
- Key Falls

== See also ==
- List of waterfalls
- List of waterfalls in North Carolina
