= Moore Cove Falls =

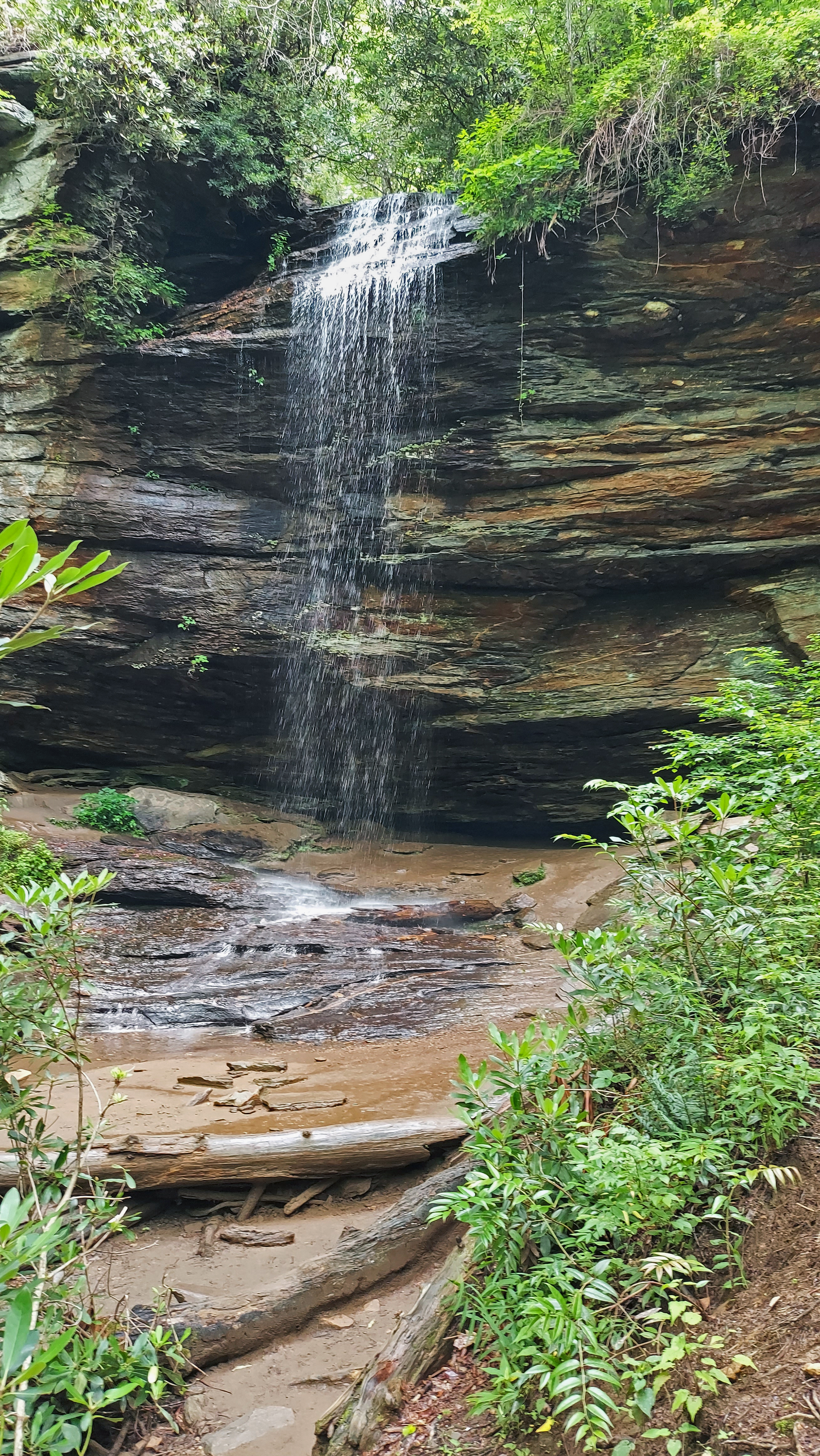
- Moore Cove Falls
- Interactive map of Moore Cove Falls
- Location: Pisgah National Forest, Transylvania County, North Carolina
- Coordinates: 35.311538°N 82.777368°W
- Type: Plunge
- Total height: 50 ft (15 m)
- Number of drops: 1

Recording of Moore Cove Falls in early summer

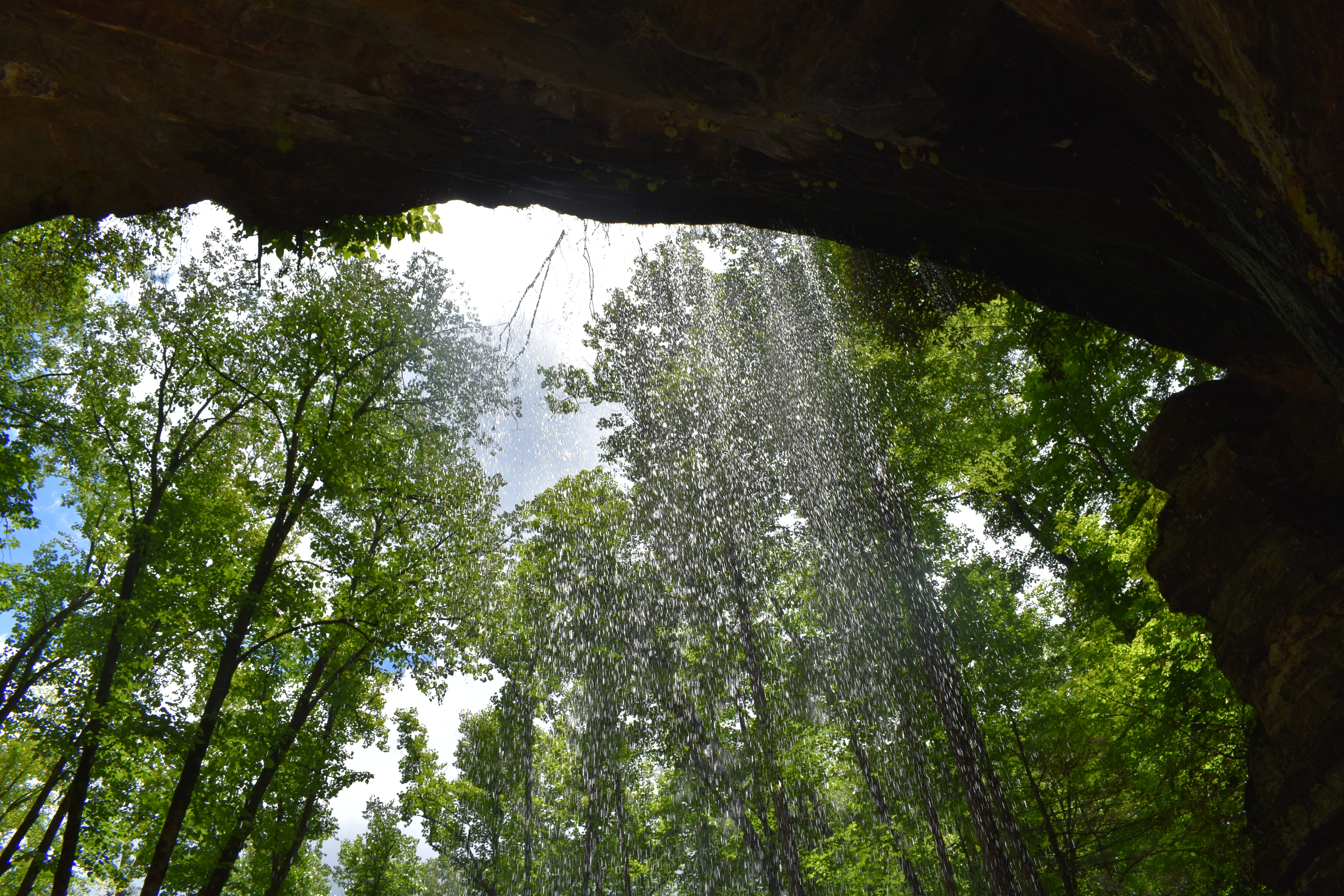
Inside of Moore Cove Falls

Moore Cove Falls is a waterfall in Pisgah National Forest in Western North Carolina, located near Brevard.

== Natural history ==
The name comes from Moore Cove, and was named for Adam Q. Moore, who purchased the property. In 1891, the property was sold to George W. Vanderbilt for $155 to become part of the Pisgah National Forest.

== Geology ==
The waterway is Moore Creek, which flows through the Pisgah National Forest. The falls flows over an overhanging bluff that allows visitors to walk behind the falls. The creek occasionally dries to a trickle.

== Visiting the waterfall ==
The waterfall is open to the public and is accessible beginning at a parking area on the side of U.S. Highway 276, approximately 6.6 miles north of the intersection of 276, U.S. Highway 64, and NC Highway 280 in Brevard, North Carolina. Visitors may take a moderate-difficulty ¾-mile (1.2 km) trail to the falls.

As with all waterfalls, hikers must exercise caution. While the area around the bottom of the falls is flat and generally not dangerous, unofficial paths lead to the top of the falls and are treacherous. On April 29, 2007, a hiker fell from the top of the falls to his death. On November 22, 2016, another hiker fell from the top of the falls to his death. Another hiker died here while trying to cross the top of the falls on August 23, 2017.

== Nearby falls ==
There are several sliding falls along the trail to Moore Cove. At Moore Cove, there is a smaller, nearly identical waterfall on the side of the cove opposite the trail. It is much more difficult to get to, and is usually not attractive for waterfall tourists.

- Looking Glass Falls
- Slick Rock Falls
- Sliding Rock
- Cedar Rock Falls
- Cove Creek Falls
- Daniel Ridge Falls
- Twin Falls
- Log Hollow Falls
- Falls on Log Hollow Branch
- Key Falls

== See also ==
- List of waterfalls
- List of waterfalls in North Carolina
