= Betsey's Rock Falls =

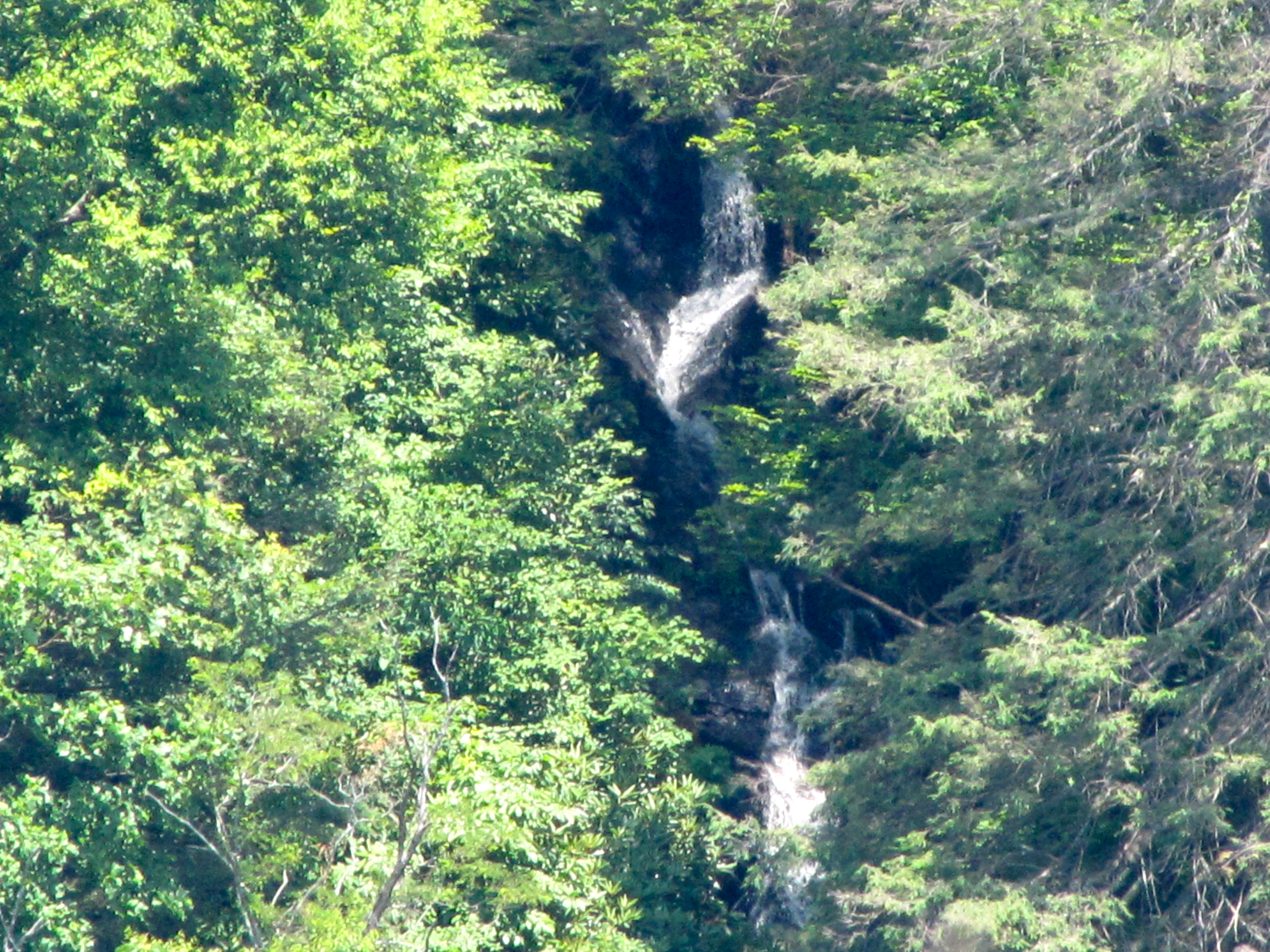
- Betsey's Rock Falls
- Interactive map of Betsey's Rock Falls
- Location: Wilkes County, in the Blue Ridge Mountains of North Carolina
- Coordinates: 36.249341°N 81.454337°W
- Type: Cascade
- Total height: 200 ft.

Betsey's Rock Falls is a waterfall in Wilkes County, North Carolina.

== Geology ==
The falls is a long series of cascades beginning at Betsey's Rock, located near the headwaters of North Prong Lewis Fork in Wilkes County in North Carolina. The rock and falls were named for Betsey Pierce, a woman who lived there with her two children during the American Civil War growing and selling ginseng.

== Visiting the falls ==
An overlook for Betseys Rock Falls is located 4.1 miles north of the parking area for Cascade Falls at milepost 267.8. The waterfall is located across the drainage, but is difficult to see at any time other than winter after a heavy rain.

== Nearby falls ==
Cascade Falls

== See also ==
- List of waterfalls
- List of waterfalls in North Carolina
