= Silver Run Falls =

Waterfall in North Carolina, United States

Coordinates: 35°03′58″N 83°03′55″W

Silver Run Falls

Silver Run Falls is a 25-foot waterfall a few miles from the town of Cashiers, North Carolina. The parking area, trail to the falls, and the falls are all within the Nantahala National Forest. It is popular with locals and tourists alike. The falls are located after a mostly flat 0.4 mile out and back trail. Additionally, there is a second secret falls located above Silver Run. On the left side of the cliff face of the falls, just inside the woods, there is a slope of granite with many roots for handholds leading to the top of the falls. Follow the trail up top until you hear the second falls on your right.

== See also ==
- List of waterfalls
- List of waterfalls in North Carolina
