= Hickory Nut Falls =

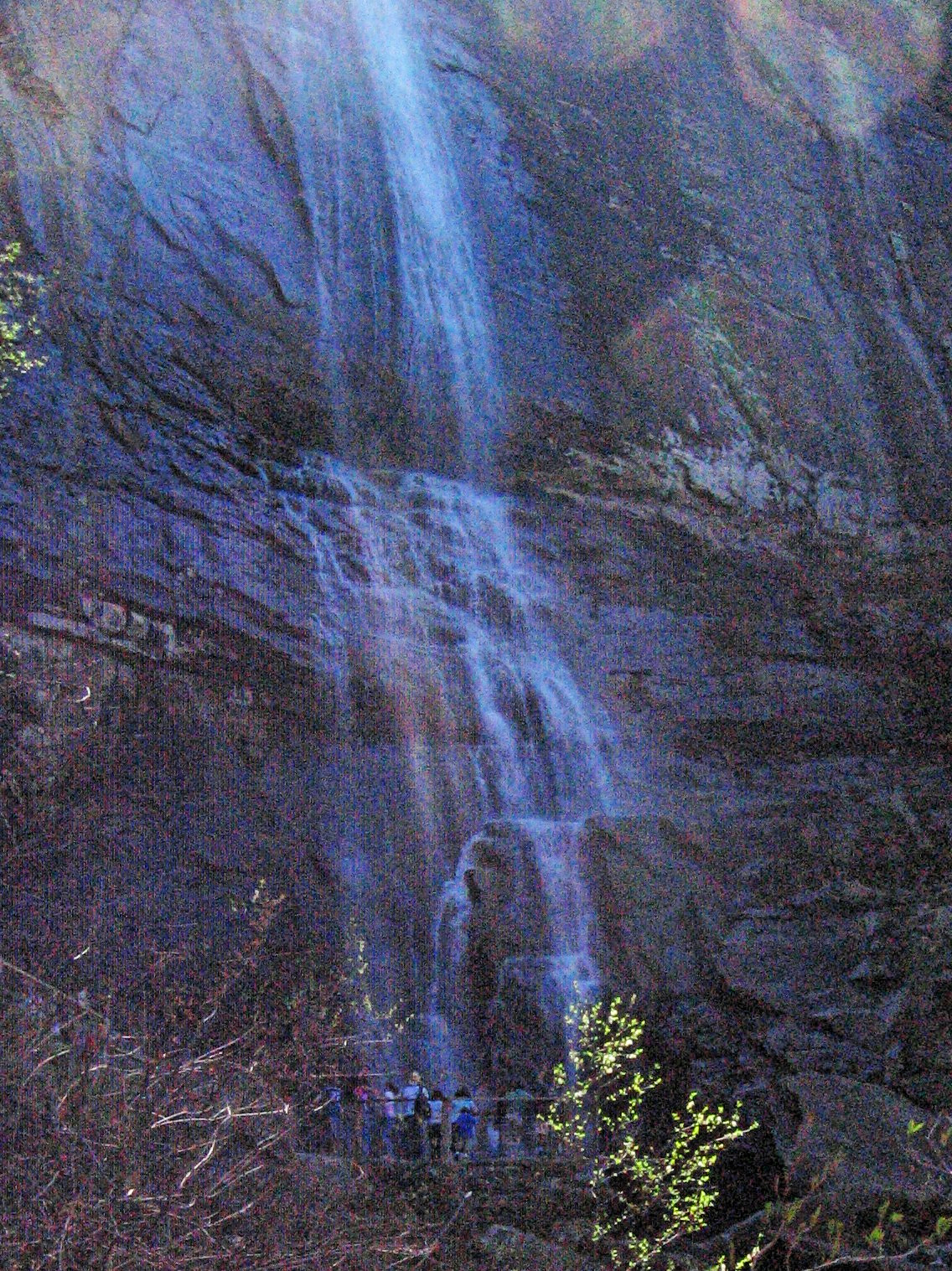
- Interactive map of Hickory Nut Falls
- Location: Chimney Rock Park, Blue Ridge Mountains, Rutherford County, North Carolina
- Coordinates: 35.433083°N 82.259444°W
- Type: Horsetail, Cascade
- Total height: 404 ft (123 m)
- Longest drop: 351 ft (107 m)

Hickory Nut Falls, also known as Hickorynut Falls, is a waterfall located at Chimney Rock State Park in Rutherford County, North Carolina.

== History ==
Hickory Nut Falls flows on Fall Creek through the Hickory Nut Gorge, and is part of Chimney Rock Park, a park that was privately owned until May 2007, when the State of North Carolina completed the purchase of the park. Chimney Rock Park and the Hickory Nut Gorge are being developed into a state park.

Prior to 2007, the park and the falls were owned by the Morse family, and were widely known to Southerners for over 100 years. National attention came to the park and the falls when they were featured in the 1992 film The Last of the Mohicans. The park was heavily featured at the end, and the final fight scene between Chingachgook and Magua was filmed at the brink of the falls.

== Visiting the Falls ==
Visitors to the falls may view it from U. S. Highway 64 for free. To view the falls more closely, visitors must pay an admission fee ($17 for adults, $8 for children as of 2019) at the park gate. After admission, visitors may hike the moderate-difficulty 1.5 mi (2.4 km) round-trip Hickory Nut Falls Trail to the base of the falls. In 2017, the improved Skyline trail to the top of the falls was reopened.

== Nearby Falls ==
There are several falls above the main drop of Hickory Nut Falls. Other falls in the area include:

- Rainbow Falls (Rutherford County)
- Camp Minnehaha Falls - a cascade on Grassy Creek that has a winter roadside view. To see the falls, from the Intersection of US 74A and NC 9, go 0.8 miles (1.3 km) north. Parks in the pullout on the left just before the guardrail.
- The Cascades - a waterfall on Grassy Creek upstream from Camp Minnehaha Falls that is on private property
- Pool Creek Falls - a slide waterfall in an area currently restricted to public access, but that will be part of the new State Park
- Wolf Creek Falls - another waterfall in the same restricted area

== See also ==
- List of waterfalls
- List of waterfalls in North Carolina
