= Mitchell Falls =

Mitchell's Falls, 1859
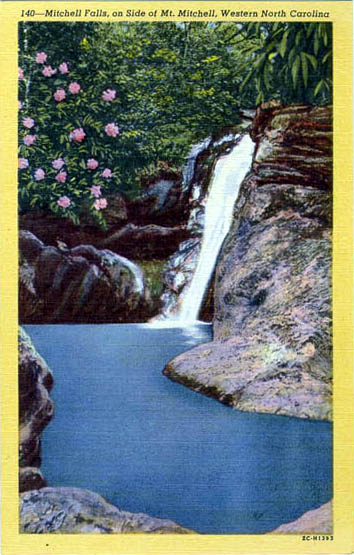
- Interactive map of Mitchell's Falls, 1859
- Location: Blue Ridge Mountains, Yancey County, North Carolina
- Coordinates: 35.773945°N 82.283653°W
- Type: Slide
- Total height: 25 feet (7.6 m)

Mitchell Falls is a 25-foot (7.6 m) waterfall located in Yancey County, North Carolina on the slope of Mount Mitchell, the highest mountain in the Appalachian Mountain chain and highest point in the eastern United States. The falls, the mountain and its related state park are named for Elisha Mitchell, a professor who, while confirming his measurements of the mountain, fell over a rocky ledge above the falls to his death on June 27, 1857.

== Visiting the falls ==
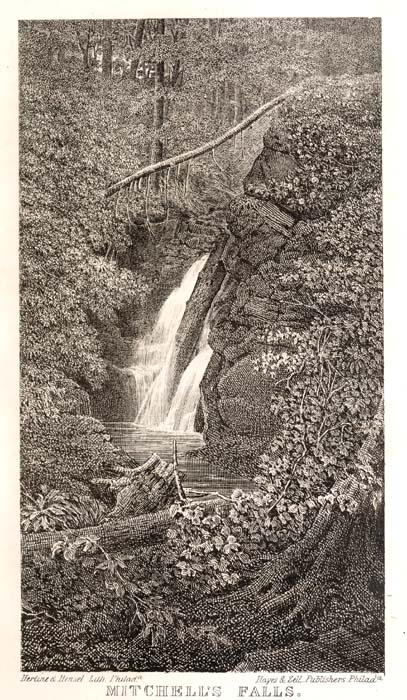
Image of Mitchell Falls from 1859 book

The falls are located downstream from "far downstream of the Mount Mitchell State Park boundary" on a private property hunting reserve. Although it is normally forbidden, groups and photographers have in the past received special permission to access the falls. As the landowner has been an environmentally-conscious steward for the tract of land on which the falls lie, people wishing to visit the falls are highly encouraged to respect this and not to trespass in an attempt to see the falls but wait until such a trip is organized.

== Nearby falls ==
- Several unnamed falls, including a 45-foot (14 m) fall occasionally mislabeled as Mitchell Falls
- Walker Falls
- Douglas Falls
- Glassmine Falls
- Setrock Creek Falls
- Roaring Fork Falls
- Whiteoak Creek Falls

Occasional published works have erroneously identified the falls which has created some confusion as to which waterfall in the area is actually Mitchell Falls. Kevin Adams' book North Carolina Waterfalls misidentifies the falls from mislabeled photographs by George Masa and Rufus Morgan. The 45-foot (14 m) falls listed in the Adams book use photographs by George Masa. The author updated his website with the corrected information and acknowledged the difficulty of many people identifying the correct waterfall because of four historical photos. All three falls (Mitchell Falls, those photographed by George Masa, and those photographed by Rufus Morgan) are on private property.

== See also ==
- List of waterfalls
- List of waterfalls in North Carolina
