= Rainbow Falls (Rutherford County) =

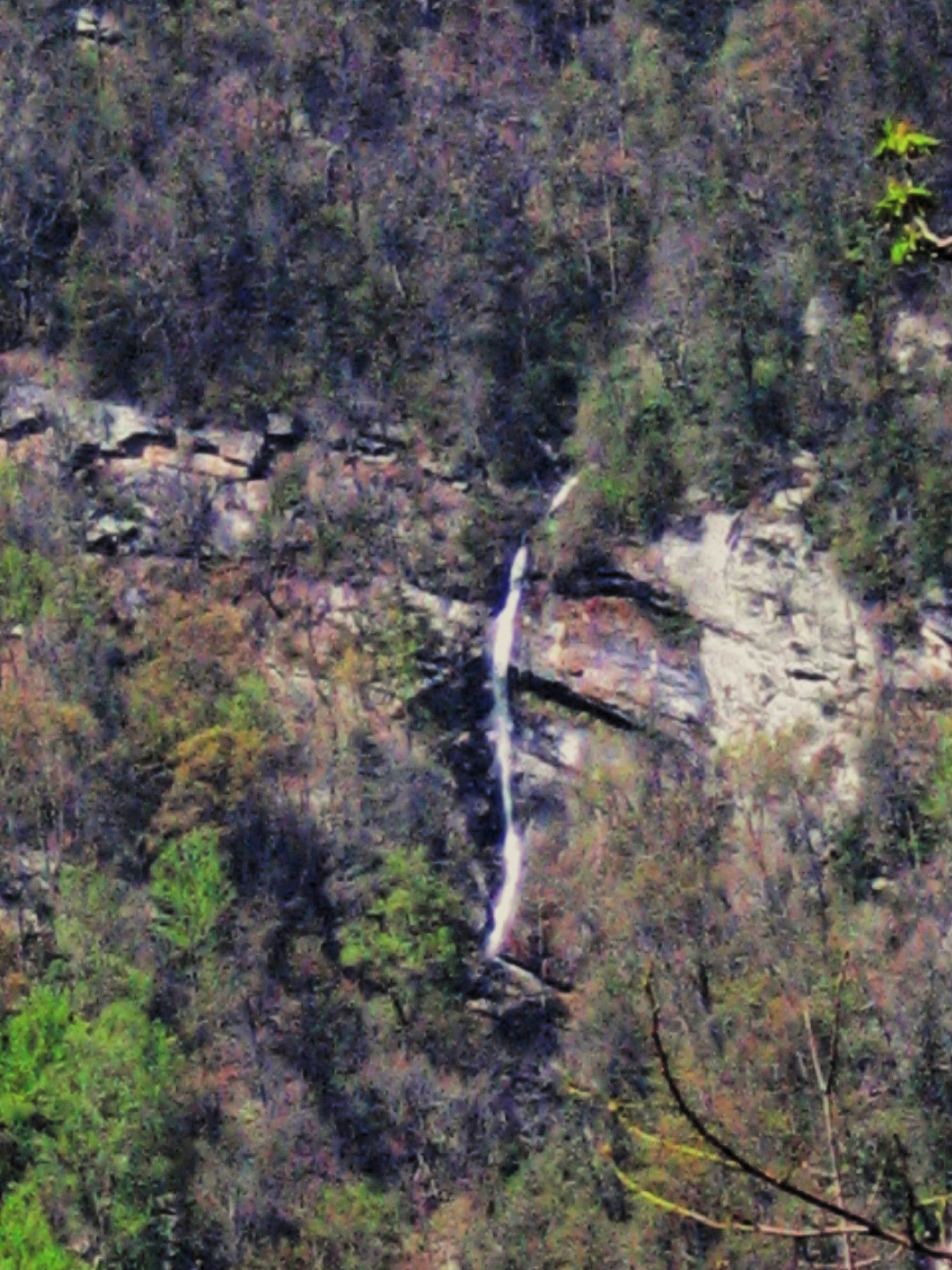
- Interactive map of Rainbow Falls
- Location: Chimney Rock, Blue Ridge Mountains, Rutherford County, North Carolina
- Coordinates: 35.449148°N 82.256289°W
- Type: Horsetail, Cascade
- Total height: 160 ft (49 m)

Rainbow Falls is a waterfall located in Chimney Rock, Rutherford County, North Carolina.

== History ==
Rainbow Falls was owned privately until it was bought by The Nature Conservancy in 2003. While much of the area is expected to be developed into a state park, including the nearby Chimney Rock Park, current plans to make Rainbow Falls accessible to the public are uncertain.

== Visiting the Falls ==
Access to Rainbow Falls is prohibited. However, it is possible to view the falls during spring and winter from at least one point on the Hickory Nut Falls trail, at Chimney Rock Park. It will be more difficult to view the falls during the summer and fall due to foliage on the trees, and binoculars will make viewing them easier.

== Nearby falls ==
There are several falls above the main drop of Hickory Nut Falls. Other falls in the area include:

- Hickory Nut Falls
- Camp Minnehaha Falls – a cascade on Grassy Creek that has a winter roadside view. To see the falls, from the Intersection of US 74A and NC 9, go 0.8 miles (1.3 km) north. Parks in the pullout on the left just before the guardrail.
- The Cascades – a waterfall on Grassy Creek upstream from Camp Minnehaha Falls that is on private property
- Pool Creek Falls – a slide waterfall in an area currently restricted to public access, but that will be part of the new State Park
- Wolf Creek Falls – another waterfall in the same restricted area

== See also ==
- List of waterfalls
- List of waterfalls in North Carolina
