= Walker Falls =

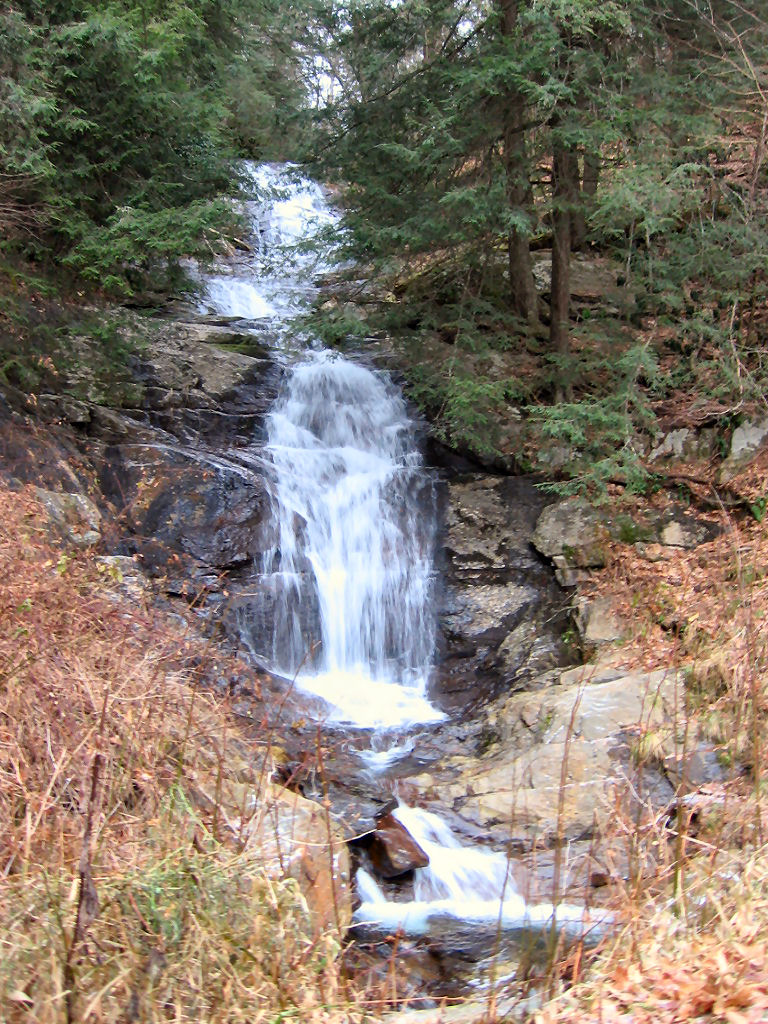
- Interactive map of Walker Falls
- Location: Blue Ridge Mountains, Buncombe County, North Carolina
- Coordinates: 35.755565°N 82.354372°W
- Type: Tiered Cascade
- Total height: 45 ft (14 m)

Walker Falls is a 45-foot cascading waterfall in Buncombe County, North Carolina. Its ease of access makes it a popular destination for waterfall hunters. It is in a region of Buncombe County that has a large number of small waterfalls and several larger falls.

== Natural history ==
The falls are located on Walker Branch in the Pisgah National Forest near Barnardsville, North Carolina.

== Visiting the Falls ==
The falls is viewable on the side of the road. To view the falls, from the intersection of NC 197 and Dillingham Rd. in Barnardsville and go 2.2 miles on Dillingham Rd. to a fork in the road. Take the left fork and go 2.7 miles, when the road turns to gravel and becomes Forest Road 74. Go 2.8 miles more to see a small sliding waterfall. 1.3 miles later, you will come up on Walker Falls. You may then go 4.7 miles further down Forest Road 74 to the parking area for Douglas Falls.

If you are coming from the Blue Ridge Parkway, follow Forest Road 63 (if it is not gated) to Dillingham Road. Turn right, and in 1.4 miles you will reach the point where the road becomes Forest Road 74. Continue following the directions as above.

Note: Dillingham Rd. only has one way in and out. If you do not plan to visit the falls further down Dillingham Rd. you'll need to go back out the way you entered.

== Nearby falls ==
- Several Unnamed Falls
- Douglas Falls
- Glassmine Falls
- Mitchell Falls
- Setrock Creek Falls
- Roaring Fork Falls
- Whiteoak Creek Falls

== See also ==
- List of waterfalls
- List of waterfalls in North Carolina
