= Roaring Fork Falls (Yancey County) =

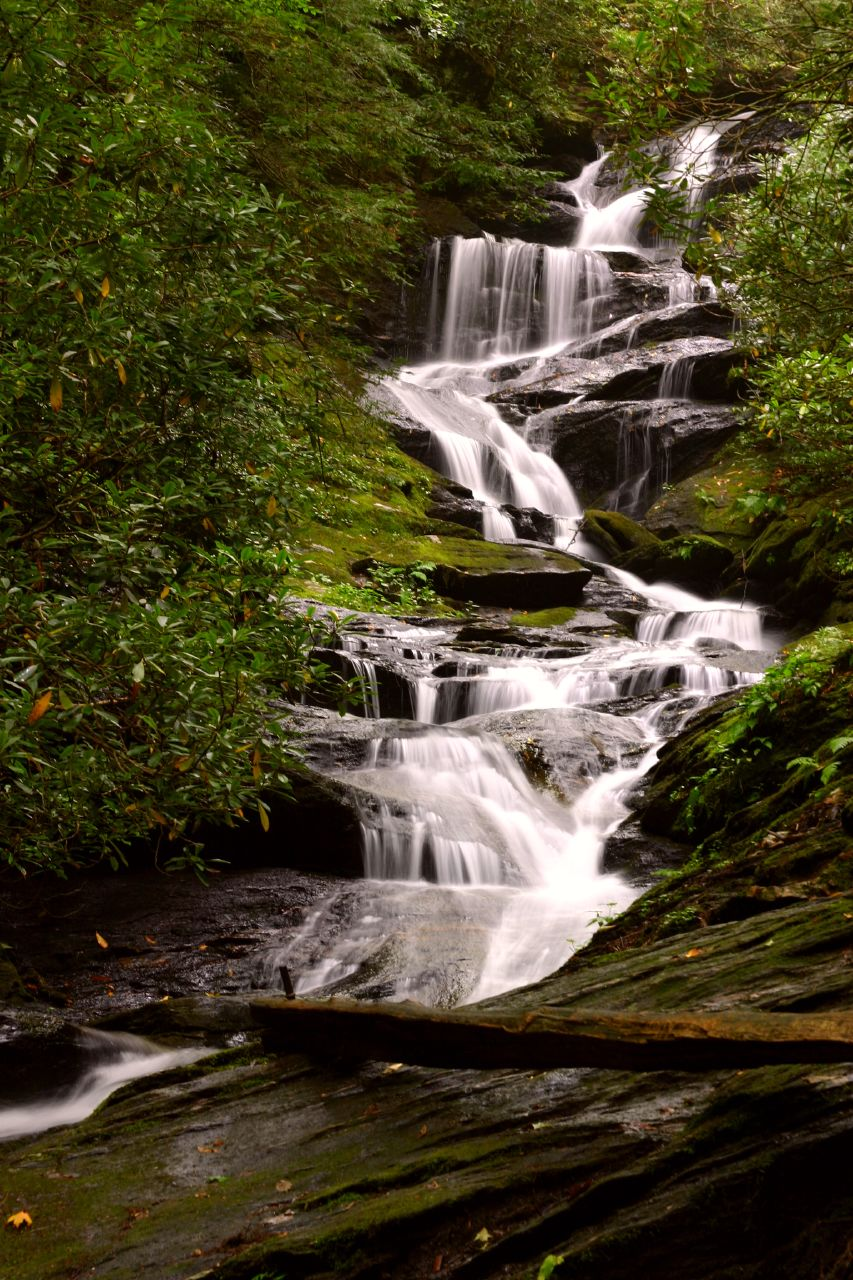
- Interactive map of Roaring Fork Falls
- Location: Pisgah National Forest, Yancey County, in the Blue Ridge Mountains of North Carolina
- Coordinates: 35.76681°N 82.19273°W
- Type: Cascade, Slide
- Total height: 45 feet (14 m) - disputed

Roaring Fork Falls, also called Roaring Creek Falls, is a waterfall in the Pisgah National Forest, in North Carolina.

== Geology ==
The falls is located on Roaring Fork, a tributary of the South Toe River, which itself is a tributary of the Nolichuky River. The creek is located in a forest that's filled with rhododendron and eastern hemlock. The creek is abundant with freshwater snails.

== Height ==
There are some disputes as to the height of the falls. Kevin Adams' book, North Carolina Waterfalls, lists the height as "about 45 ft (17 m) high". North Carolina Waterfalls lists the falls as being 100 feet (30.9 m) "long".

== Visiting the Falls ==
From the intersection of NC 80 and the Blue Ridge Parkway, go 2.2 miles north on NC 80 and turn left on South Toe River Road. Cross the bridge and turn left. Follow the road 0.2 miles to the gate and parking area. From here, follow the trail (passing concrete bunkers formerly used to store explosives) for 0.61 mi. (1.34 km) to a side trail that will lead to the falls in 300 ft (93 m).

== Nearby falls ==
- Setrock Creek Falls
- Mitchell Falls
- Douglas Falls
- Walker Falls
- Whiteoak Creek Falls
- Crabtree Falls

== See also ==
- List of waterfalls
- List of waterfalls in North Carolina
