= Shunkawauken Falls =

Waterfall in North Carolina

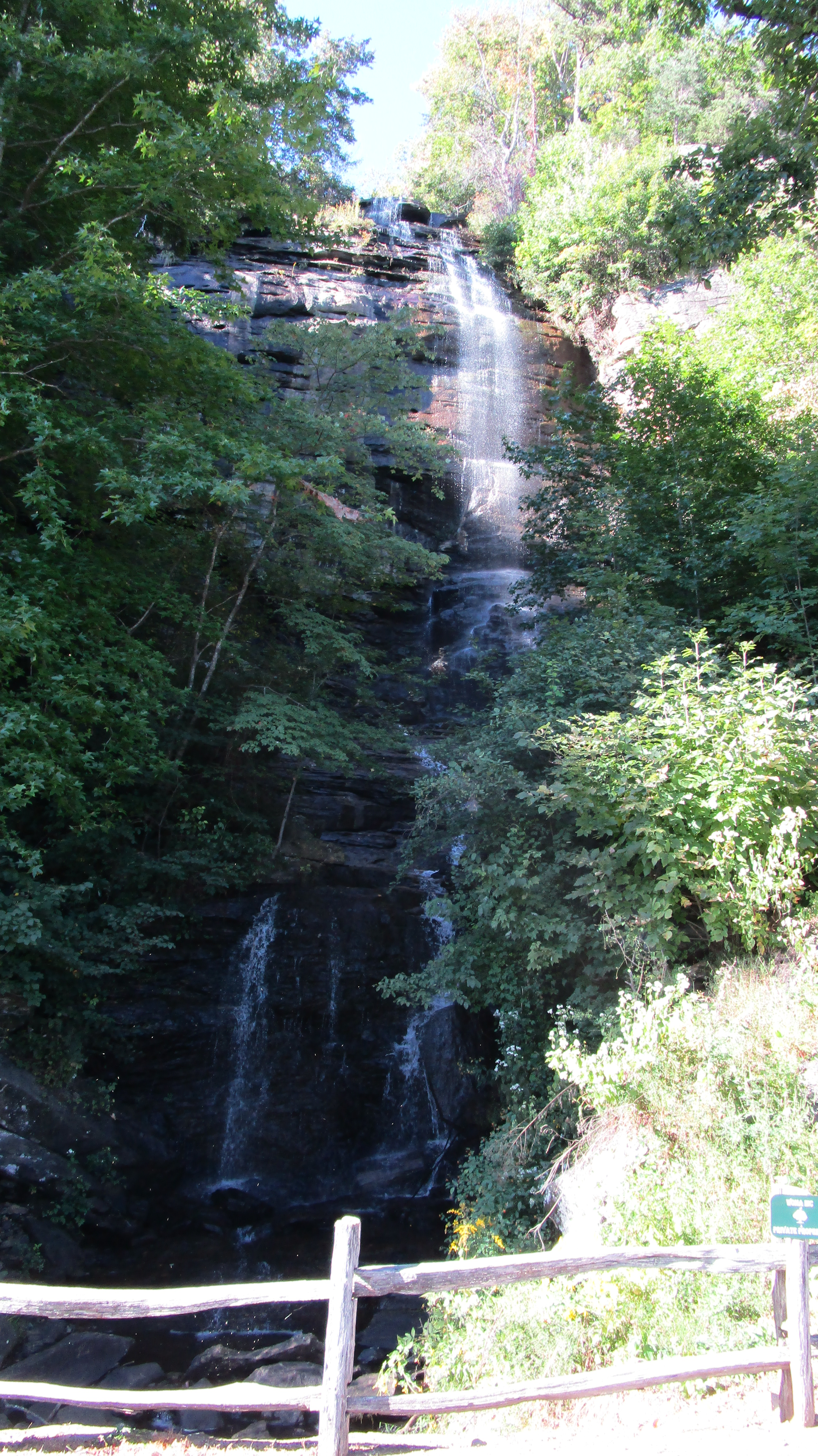
- View of Shunkawauken Falls from White Oak Mountain Drive
- Interactive map of Shunkawauken Falls
- Location: Polk County, North Carolina
- Coordinates: 35°16′19.9″N 82°12′53.0″W
- Type: Tiered cascade
- Elevation: 2,360 ft (720 m)
- Total height: 150 ft (46 m)
- Watercourse: Horse Creek

Shunkawauken Falls is a 150 ft (46 m) waterfall located in Polk County, near Columbus, North Carolina. The falls are fed by a pond a few metres upstream. It is a local attraction, although it is located on private property.

According to local lore, a Native American chief named Shunkawauken lived in this area in the 1800s. The falls, previously named Horse Creek Falls, were renamed in his memory in 1891.

== See also ==
- List of waterfalls
- List of waterfalls in North Carolina
