= Waterfall on West Prong Hickey Fork =

Waterfall on West Prong Hickey Fork Creek
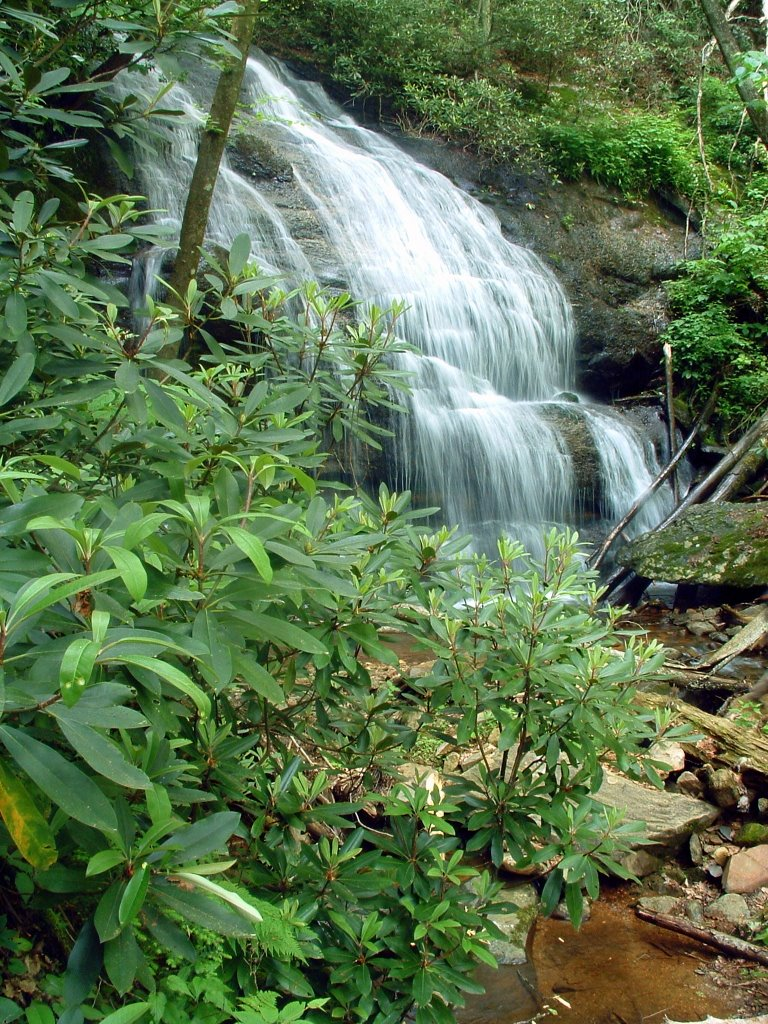
- Waterfall on West Prong Hickey Fork Creek
- Interactive map of Waterfall on West Prong Hickey Fork Creek
- Location: Pisgah National Forest, Madison County, in the Blue Ridge Mountains of North Carolina
- Coordinates: 35.995446°N 82.717781°W
- Type: Slide, Cascade
- Total height: 30 ft (9.1 m)
- Longest drop: 30 ft (9.1 m)

Waterfall on West Prong Hickey Fork is a waterfall located in the Bald Mountains of the Pisgah National Forest in Madison County, North Carolina.

== Geology ==
The falls flows on West Prong Hickey Fork Creek. It begins as a slide and ends in a near-vertical 30-foot drop into a flat pool at the bottom. The falls hosts a spray-cliff community on mossy rocks. Further downstream, West Prong Hickey Fork continues on a long, sliding cascade as the creek descends over 500' to join with Shelton Laurel Creel, eventually flowing into the French Broad River.

== Visiting the falls ==
From the junction of US 25/70 and NC 208, head north on 208 for 3.4 miles. Turn right on NC 212 and drive 6.8 miles. Turn left on SR 1310, which will eventually become Forest Road 465 for 1.1 miles to the parking area. Follow the 1¼ mile difficult trail to the falls. Beyond the falls, after 2 more connections, this trail will connect to the Appalachian Trail.

== See also ==
- List of waterfalls
- List of waterfalls in North Carolina
