= Bull Cove Falls =

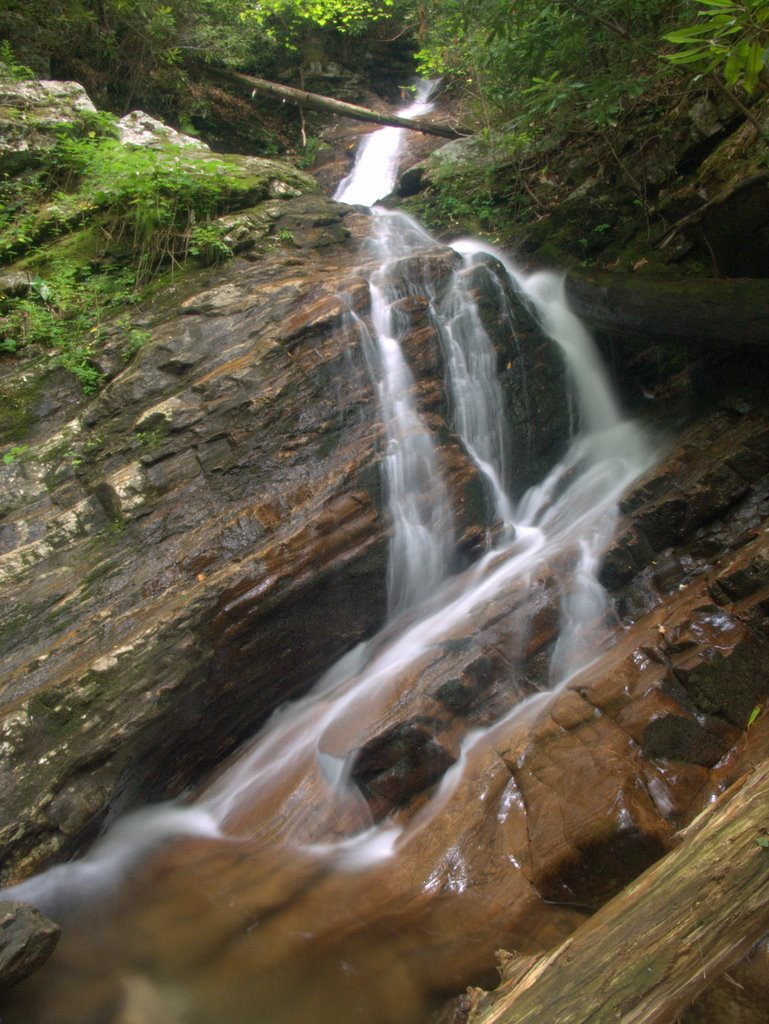
- Interactive map of Bull Cove Falls
- Location: Southern Nantahala Wilderness, Macon County, North Carolina
- Coordinates: 35.002968°N 83.543558°W
- Type: Plunge
- Total height: 40 ft (12 m)
- Number of drops: 1

Bull Cove Falls is a waterfall located in the southwestern Appalachian Mountains in North Carolina.

== Geology ==
Bull Cove Creek rises just north of the border of North Carolina and Georgia. The creek flows west over the falls, eventually merging into Beech Creek, a tributary of the Tallulah River. Bull Cove Falls itself is a two-part cascade that flows over bedrock.

== Visiting the Falls ==
To access the falls, travel on US 76 about 8 miles south from the state line. Turn right onto Persimmon Road and go 4.1 miles to Tallulah River Road. The trailhead for Bull Cove Falls is 7.6 miles up this road. The trail to the falls is a strenuous 1 mile one-way trek, and due to the wilderness nature of the area, hikers must be prepared for backcountry travel.

== Nearby falls ==
- High Falls of Beech Creek
- Big Laurel Falls
- Mooney Falls

== See also ==
- List of waterfalls
- List of waterfalls in North Carolina
