= Cascade Falls (Falls Creek) =

Waterfall in North Carolina, United States

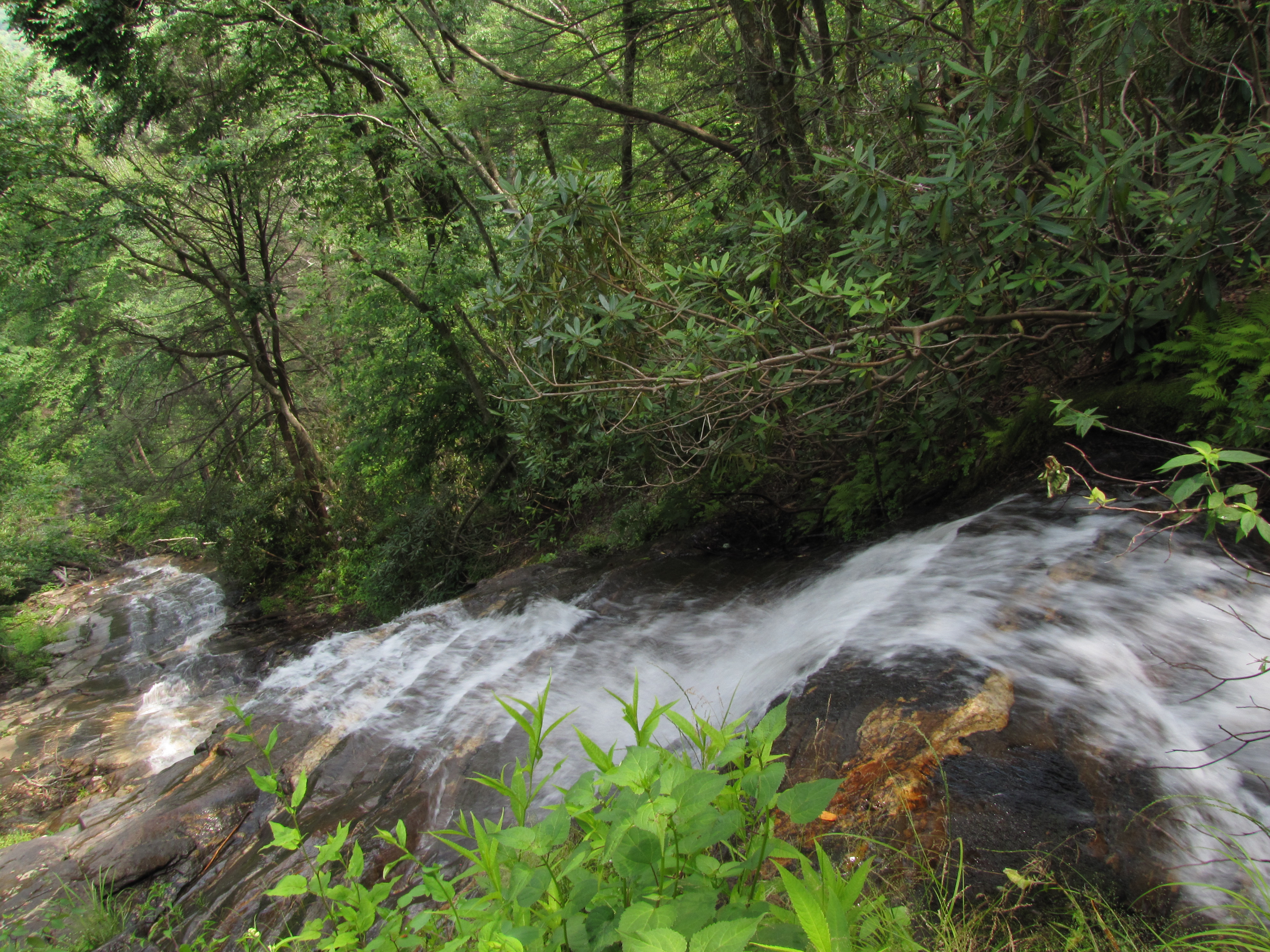
- Cascade Falls, looking down
- Interactive map of Cascade Falls
- Location: E. B. Jeffress Park, Wilkes County, in the Blue Ridge Mountains of North Carolina
- Coordinates: 36.249341°N 81.454337°W
- Type: Cascade, slide
- Total height: More than 250 ft

Cascade Falls, also called "The Cascades", is a waterfall located at E. B. Jeffress Park on the Blue Ridge Parkway in the Blue Ridge Mountains of North Carolina, United States.

== Geology ==
The waterfall is located on Falls Creek. It begins with a small free-fall before cascading and sliding down the rock face. The water here eventually ends up in the W. Kerr Scott Reservoir and the Yadkin River. Like many other falls in the northern North Carolina Mountains, the falls are high, but limited in water.

== Visiting the falls ==
The falls is located in E. B. Jeffress Park on the Blue Ridge Parkway at milepost 271.9, 4.4 miles north of where U. S. Highway 421 crosses the parkway at Deep Gap. The easy-to-moderate loop trail begins at the north end of the parking area for a total loop of approximately 0.8 mile. The trail, which includes educational material concerning local wildflowers and other plants, such as mountain laurel, descends 50 feet to an upper overlook and another 200 feet to a lower overlook. The upper overlook allows the visitors to see approximately 20 feet of cascades above the overlook and a long slide below the overlook. The lower overlook allows a different view of the slide.

The lower section of the falls is no longer accessible from the trail. A scramble path used to be available, but damage to the plant life and the banks of the stream resulted in the construction of a fence to restrict further access and potential injury to both the falls and to visitors.

== Nearby falls ==
Betsey's Rock Falls

== See also ==
- List of waterfalls
- List of waterfalls in North Carolina
