= Setrock Creek Falls =

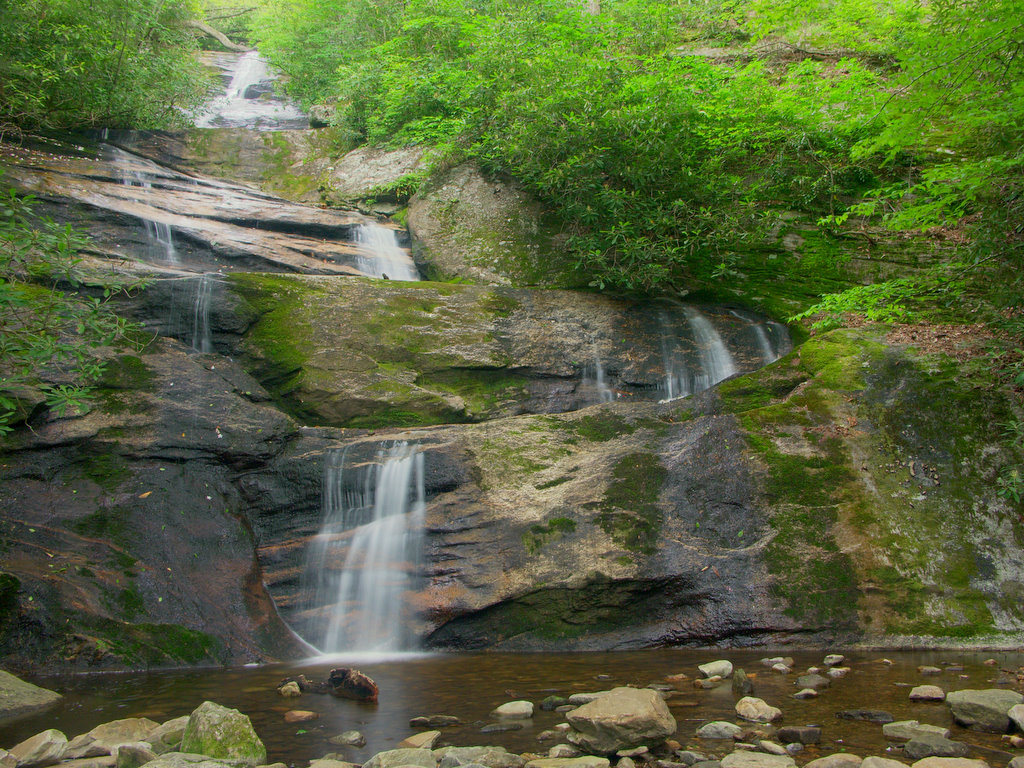
- Interactive map of Setrock Creek Falls
- Location: Pisgah National Forest, Yancey County, in the Blue Ridge Mountains of North Carolina
- Coordinates: 35.749467°N 82.227535°W
- Type: Cascade, Slide
- Total height: 55 ft (17 m) - disputed
- Number of drops: 6

Setrock Creek Falls is a waterfall in the Pisgah National Forest, in North Carolina.

== Geology ==
The falls is located at the base of Mount Mitchell, the tallest mountain in the United States east of the Mississippi River, on Setrock Creek, a small tributary of the South Toe River, which itself is a tributary of the Nolichucky River. The creek falls over multiple steep to near-vertical sections of rock under a solid canopy of trees. It has low water flow which can slow to a mere trickle in dry weather. The water clings to the rocks on its way down and ends in a nice pool at the bottom.

== Height ==
There are some disputes as to the height of the falls. Kevin Adams' book, North Carolina Waterfalls, lists the height as "about 55 ft (17 m) high", whereas the North Carolina Waterfalls website lists the height as 75 feet (23 m).

== Visiting the Falls ==
From the intersection of NC 80 and the Blue Ridge Parkway, go 2.2 miles north on NC 80 and turn left on South Toe River Road. Passing the access to Roaring Fork Falls, go 2.19 miles to the fork, go right, and go 0.61 miles further to the Black Mountain Campground. From the hiker parking area, enter the campground and take the drive furthest to the left, on Briar Bottom Road. Just over 200 yards from the parking area, the drive crosses a small creek. Take the trail on the left, pass the start of the Mount Mitchell Trail, cross Little Mountain Creek, take the right-hand path 200 yards to the falls.

== Nearby falls ==
- Roaring Fork Falls
- Mitchell Falls
- Douglas Falls
- Walker Falls
- Crabtree Falls

== See also ==
- List of waterfalls
- List of waterfalls in North Carolina
