= Of Men and Mountains =

Memoir by William O. Douglas

- Author: William O. Douglas
- Publication date: 1950
- ISBN: 978-1447400134

Of Men and Mountains is a 1950 memoir written by United States Supreme Court Justice William O. Douglas, published by Harper & Bros. The memoir recounts Douglas's experiences traveling Cascade Range, specifically around the area of Yakima, Washington..

Of Men and Mountains explores how mountaineering enabled Douglas to recover from childhood polio and improve his physical strength. Over the course of its chapters, the book explores Douglas relationship to nature, based on themes of personal resilience, solitude, wilderness, community and religion. Beyond his own experiences, Douglas also describes the people who live and enjoy the nature of the Pacific Northwest.

The book was positively received by contemporary reviewers for its descriptions of nature, personal accounts and philosophical nature. The book was later adapted to the biographical stage play Mountain: The Journey of Justice Douglas.
