= List of waterfalls in North Carolina =

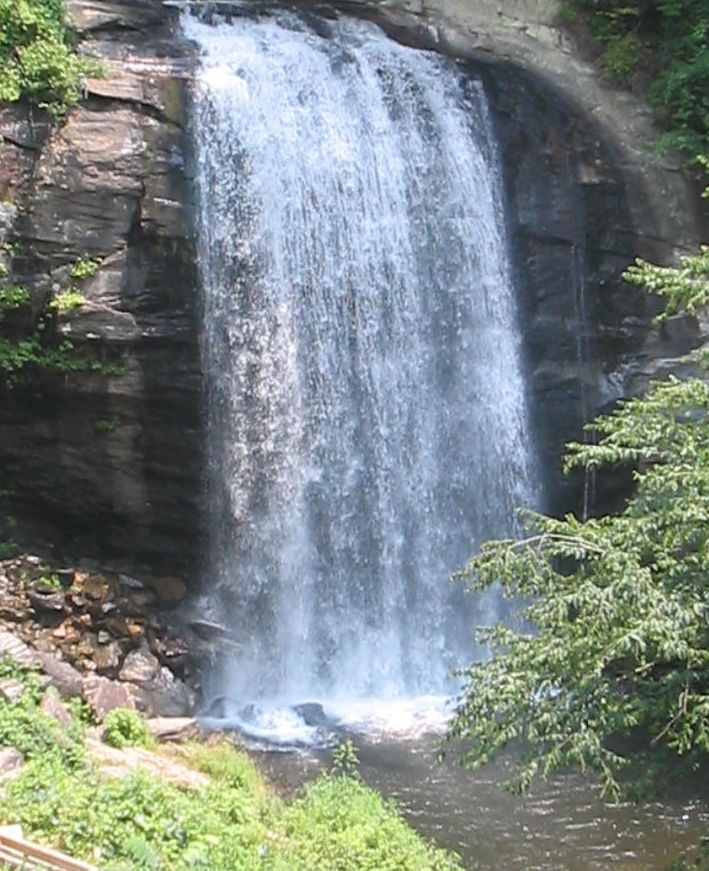
Looking Glass Falls is one of the most popular and easily accessible waterfalls in North Carolina

The waterfalls of North Carolina, U.S., are a prominent feature of the geography of the Piedmont and mountain regions of the state, as well as a major focus of tourism and outdoor recreation. Many of these falls are located in state parks, national forests, wildlife management areas, and other public lands, as well as private property. Many are accessible via established hiking trails, and some developed areas include boardwalks, observation platforms, picnic areas, and other amenities. Some of the highest and most voluminous waterfalls in the eastern United States are located in North Carolina.

Many of the waterfalls in the state are located in Transylvania County, which is called "The Land of Waterfalls". This is due to the orographic lift that results in the area having one of the highest average rainfalls in the United States (90 inches per year).

== Falls by County ==
This list is incomplete. Please feel free to add waterfalls to this list and to create articles about the waterfalls.

Visitors should always follow rules of safe waterfall hiking when visiting waterfalls.

=== Buncombe County ===
Although parts of Buncombe County receive less average rainfall than any other location in the Southeastern US, Buncombe County still has several waterfalls.

- Cascades Waterfall (Craggy Mountains)
- Douglas Falls
- Glassmine Falls
- Walker Falls
- Reems Creek Falls

=== Burke County ===
- High Shoals Falls
- Linville Falls
- McGalliard Falls

=== Clay County ===
- Bull Cove Falls

=== Jackson County ===
- Whitewater Falls

=== Macon County ===
- Bridal Veil Falls (Macon County)
- Cullasaja Falls
- Dry Falls (North Carolina)
- Quarry Falls (Macon County)
- Secret Falls

=== Madison County ===
- Waterfall on West Prong Hickey Fork

=== McDowell County ===
- Toms Creek Falls
- Catawba Falls
- Hickory Branch Trail Falls
- Crabtree Falls (North Carolina)

=== Montgomery County ===
- Moccasin Creek Falls

=== Polk County ===
- Pearson's Falls
- Big Bradley Falls
- Little Bradley Falls
- Shunkawauken Falls

=== Rutherford County ===
- Hickory Nut Falls
- Rainbow Falls (Rutherford County)

=== Stokes County ===
Home to the isolated Sauratown Mountains.

- Hidden Falls (Hanging Rock)
- Lower Cascades (Hanging Rock)
- Tory's Falls (Hanging Rock)
- Upper Cascades (Hanging Rock)
- Window Falls (Hanging Rock)

=== Swain County ===
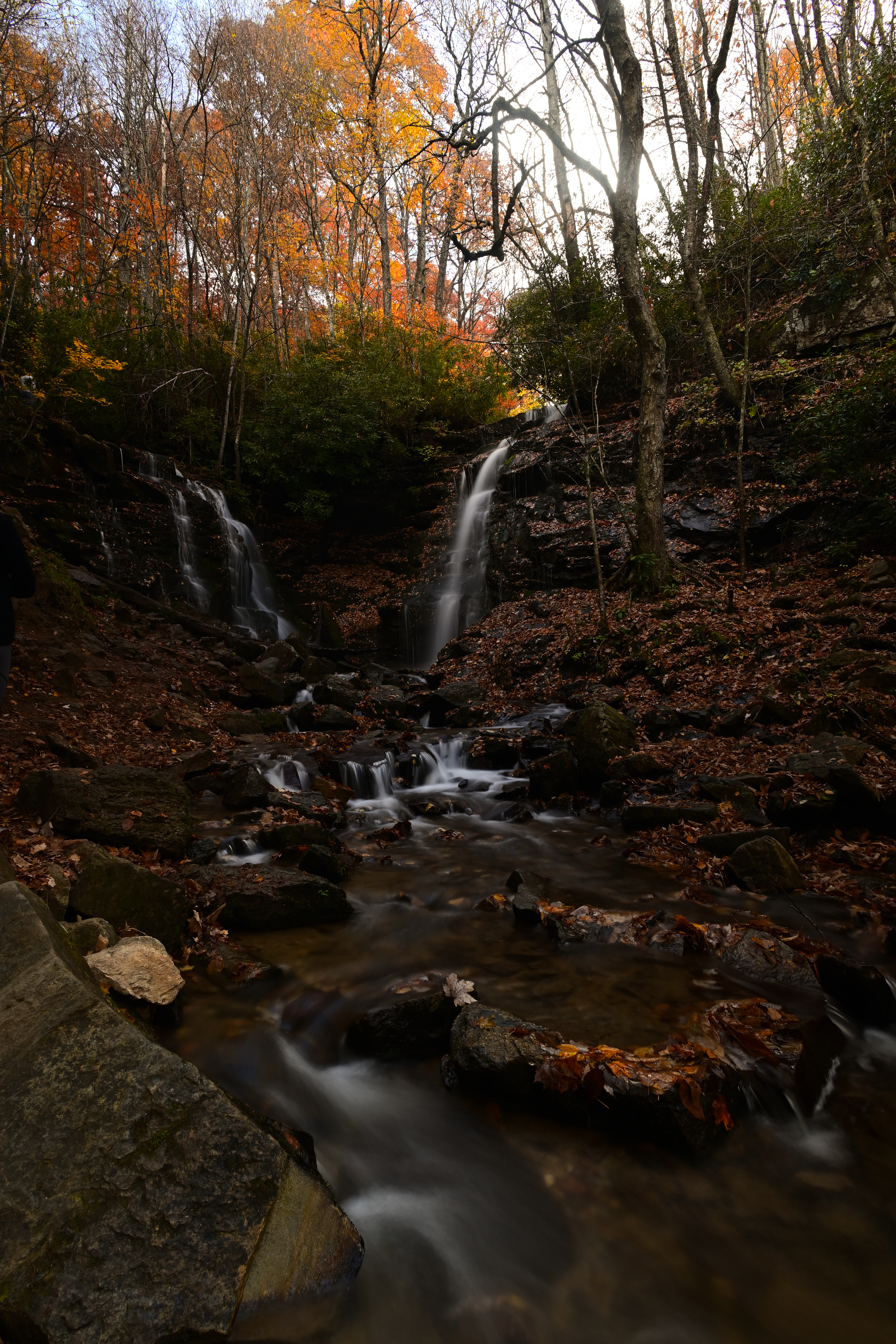
Soco Falls

- Mingo Falls
- Little Falls
- Juneywhank Falls
- Tom Branch Falls
- Indian creek Falls
- Soco Falls

=== Transylvania County ===
This area receives more average annual rainfall than any other place in the Eastern United States - over 90 inches a year.

- Bridal Veil Falls (DuPont State Forest)
- Corbin Creek Falls
- Drift Falls
- High Falls (DuPont State Forest)
- Hooker Falls
- Log Hollow Falls
- Looking Glass Falls
- Moore Cove Falls
- Rainbow Falls (Horsepasture River)
- Silver Run Falls
- Slick Rock Falls
- Sliding Rock
- Triple Falls (DuPont State Forest)
- Turtleback Falls
- Upper Whitewater Falls, part of Whitewater Falls which extends into South Carolina, which together drop over 1000' in elevation before hitting the plunge basin.

=== Wilkes County ===
- Betsey's Rock Falls
- Cascade Falls (Falls Creek)

=== Yancey County ===
- Mitchell Falls
- Roaring Fork Falls (Yancey County)
- Setrock Creek Falls

== See also ==
- List of waterfalls

== External links and resources ==
- NCWaterfalls.com
- Waterfalls in Western North Carolina
- Adams, Kevin. North Carolina Waterfalls: A Hiking and Photography Guide. Blair Publishing, 2005.
