= Crabtree Falls (North Carolina) =

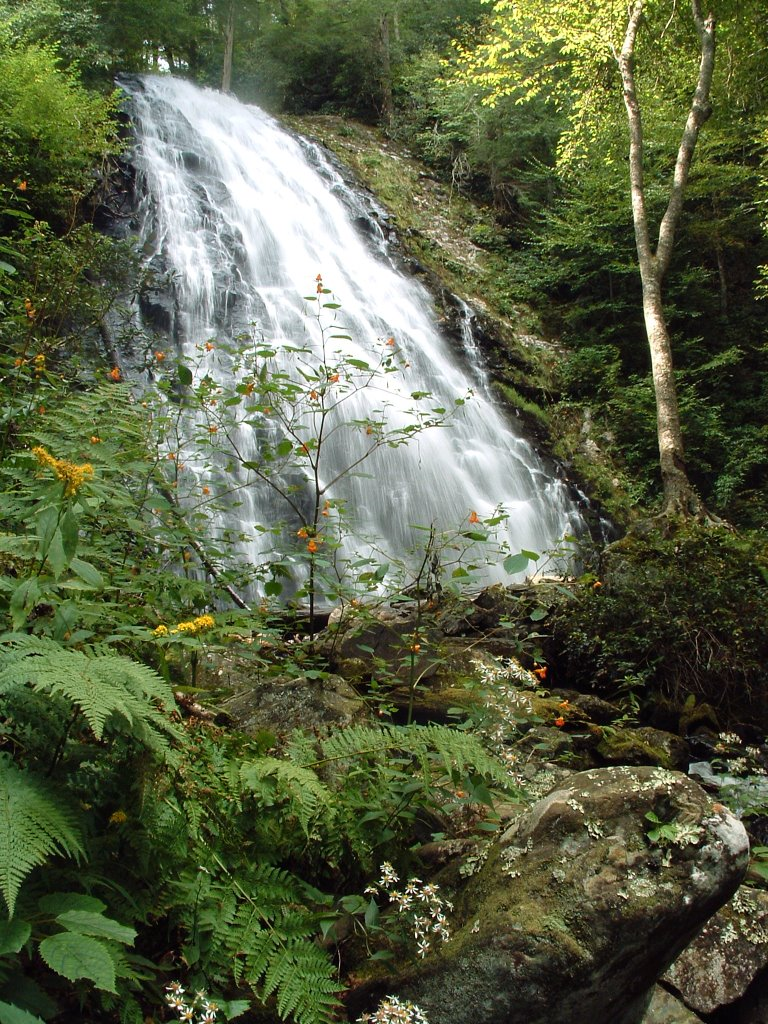
- Interactive map of Crabtree Falls
- Location: Blue Ridge Mountains, Blue Ridge Parkway, Little Switzerland, North Carolina
- Coordinates: 35.8195°N 82.1508°W
- Type: Cascade
- Total height: 70 ft (21 m)
- Number of drops: 1

Crabtree Falls is a waterfall located near the boundary of McDowell County and Yancey County, North Carolina.

== Geology and Natural History ==
Crabtree Falls is a 70-foot (21 m) cascade on Big Crabtree Creek. The creek spreads over a rock face with many small ledges, giving it a delicate appearance, before trickling into a clear pool at the base. Though there are hardly any crabtrees here now, in the spring, an impressive array of wildflowers abound on the trail, including four species of trillium. By July, ferns fill the forest and soak in the spray of the falls, with rosebay rhododendron in bloom.

== History ==
The Celo USGS topographic quadrangle map labels this falls "Upper Falls", and shows another waterfall some distance away and on another creek being called Crabtree Falls. Originally, the falls was known as Murphy's Falls and a small community was located nearby, including a church and blacksmith shop. When the Blue Ridge Parkway was constructed in the 1930s, the falls was renamed Crabtree Falls by the National Park Service.

== Visiting the falls ==
The trailhead is located outside Crabtree Falls Campground at mile marker 339.5 on the Blue Ridge Parkway. A trail leads to a footbridge over the creek at the base of the falls. The trailhead loop starts at the parking area just before the entrance to the campground, and is a medium to strenuous hike at just under 2.5 miles (4.0 km) in length. The path to the falls is a rugged, downhill 0.9-mile, with a gentler 1.5-mile (2.4 km) uphill return following Crabtree creek upstream before looping back to the parking area.

== Nearby Falls ==
- Murphy Falls
- Big Crabtree Falls
- Grassy Creek Falls
- Falls of Gouges Creek

== Gallery ==
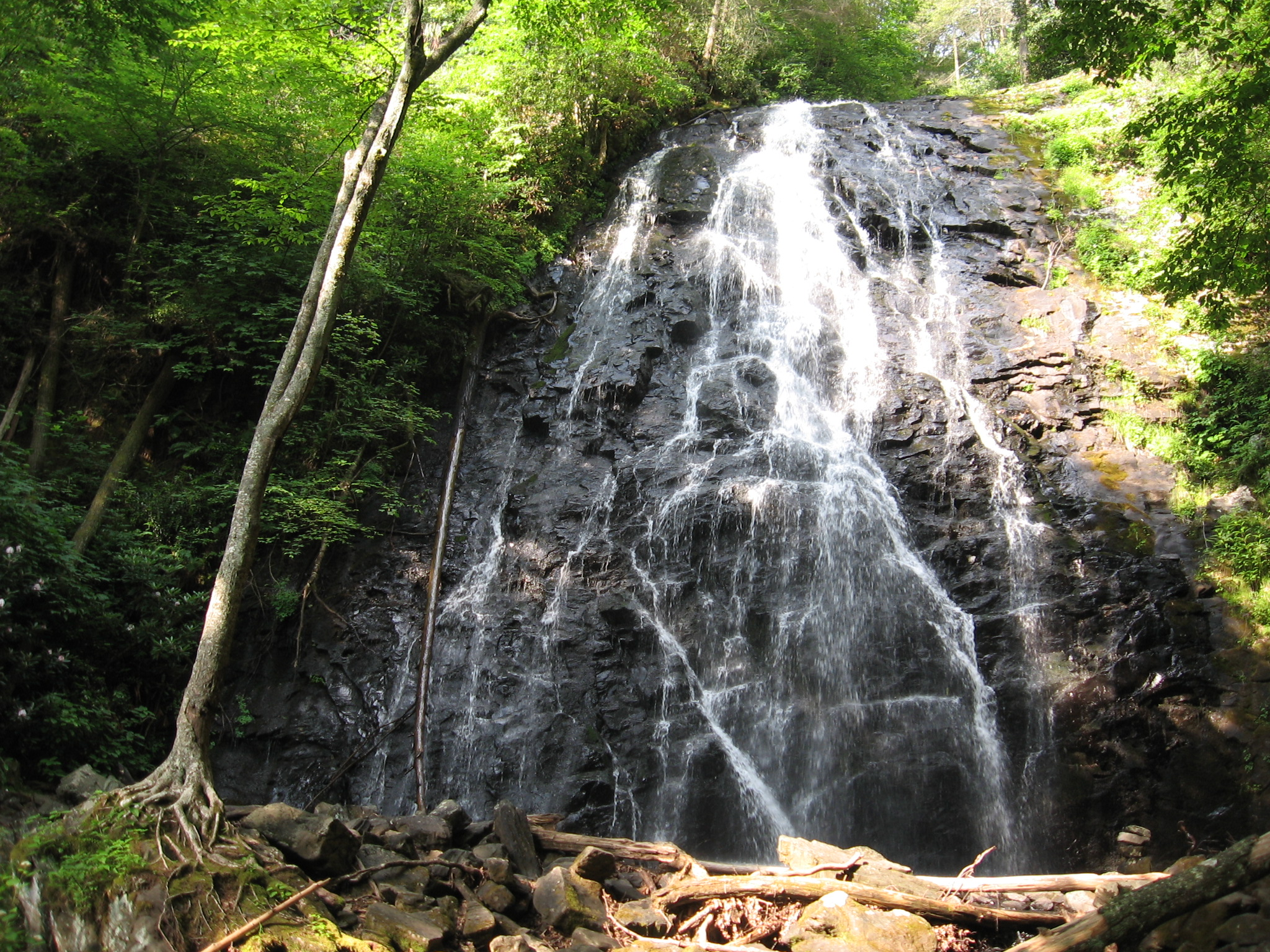
Crabtree Falls

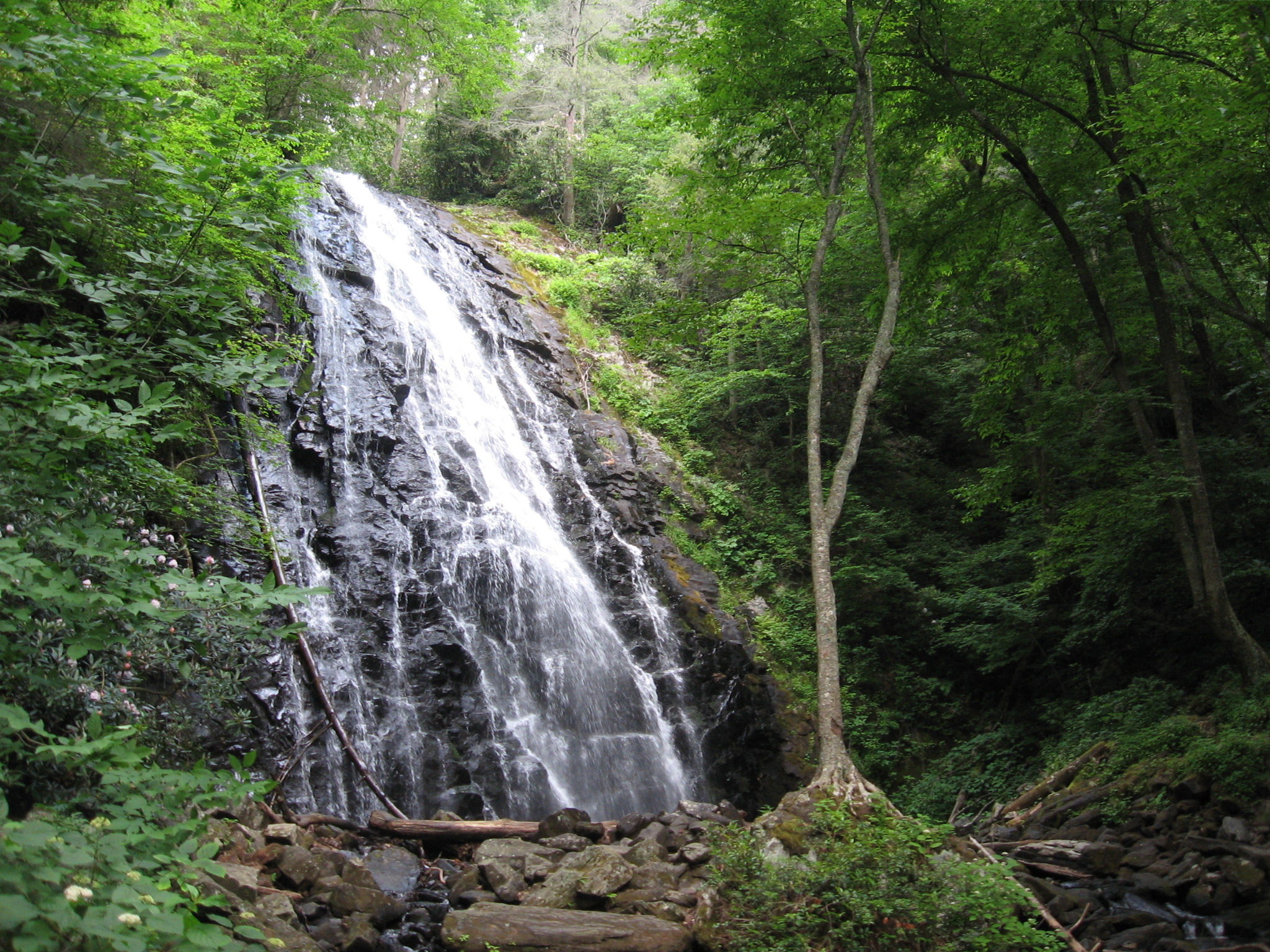
Crabtree Falls

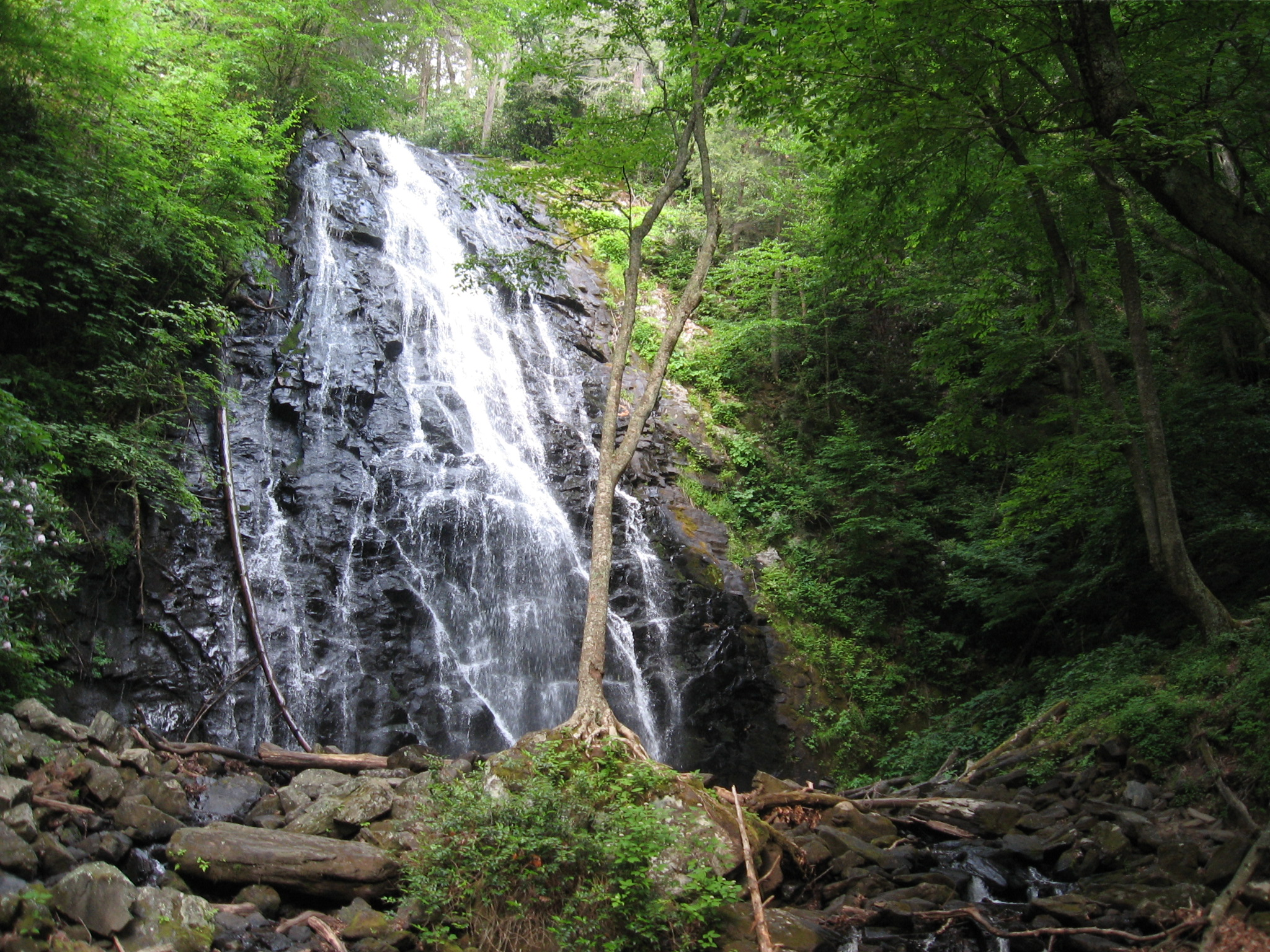
Crabtree Falls

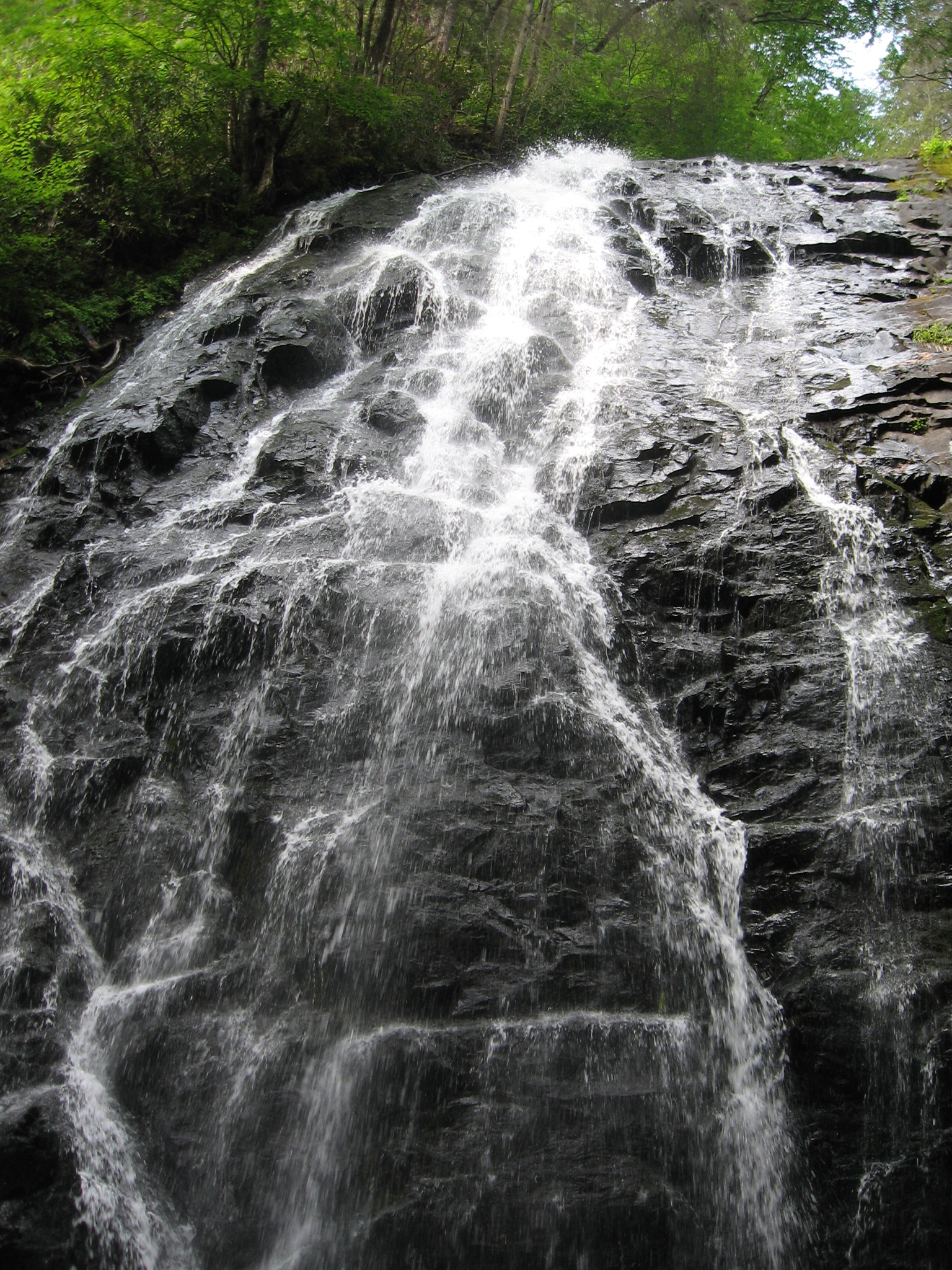
Crabtree Falls

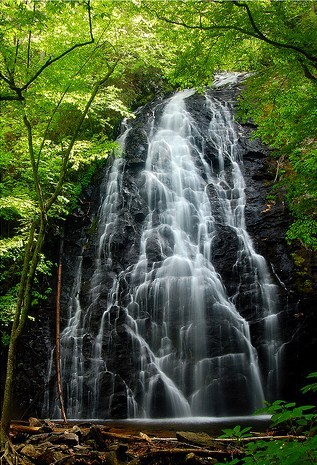
Crabtree Falls

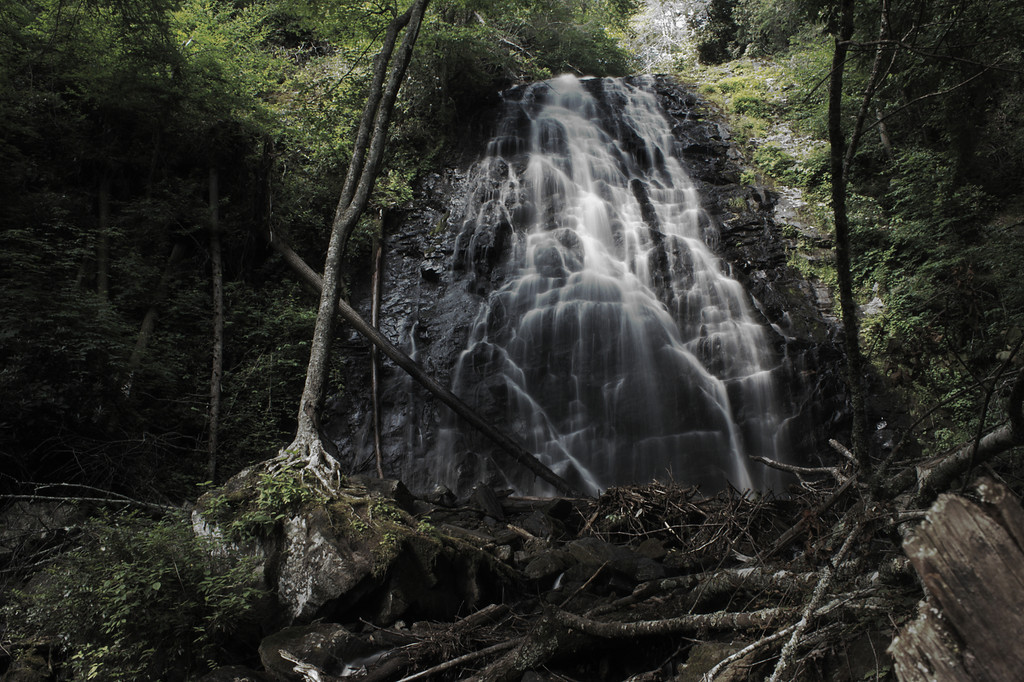
Crabtree Falls

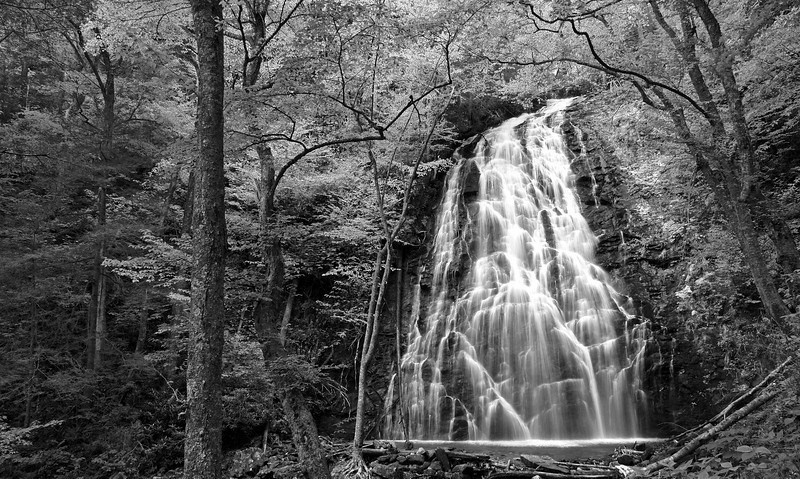
Crabtree Falls

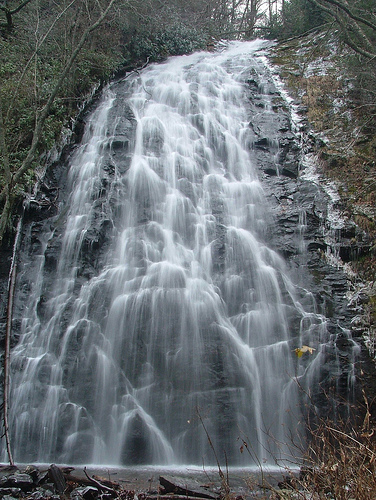
Winter

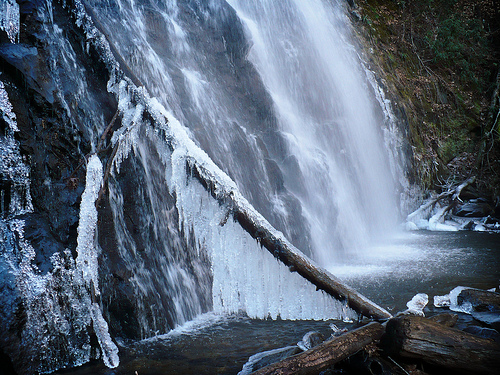
Winter

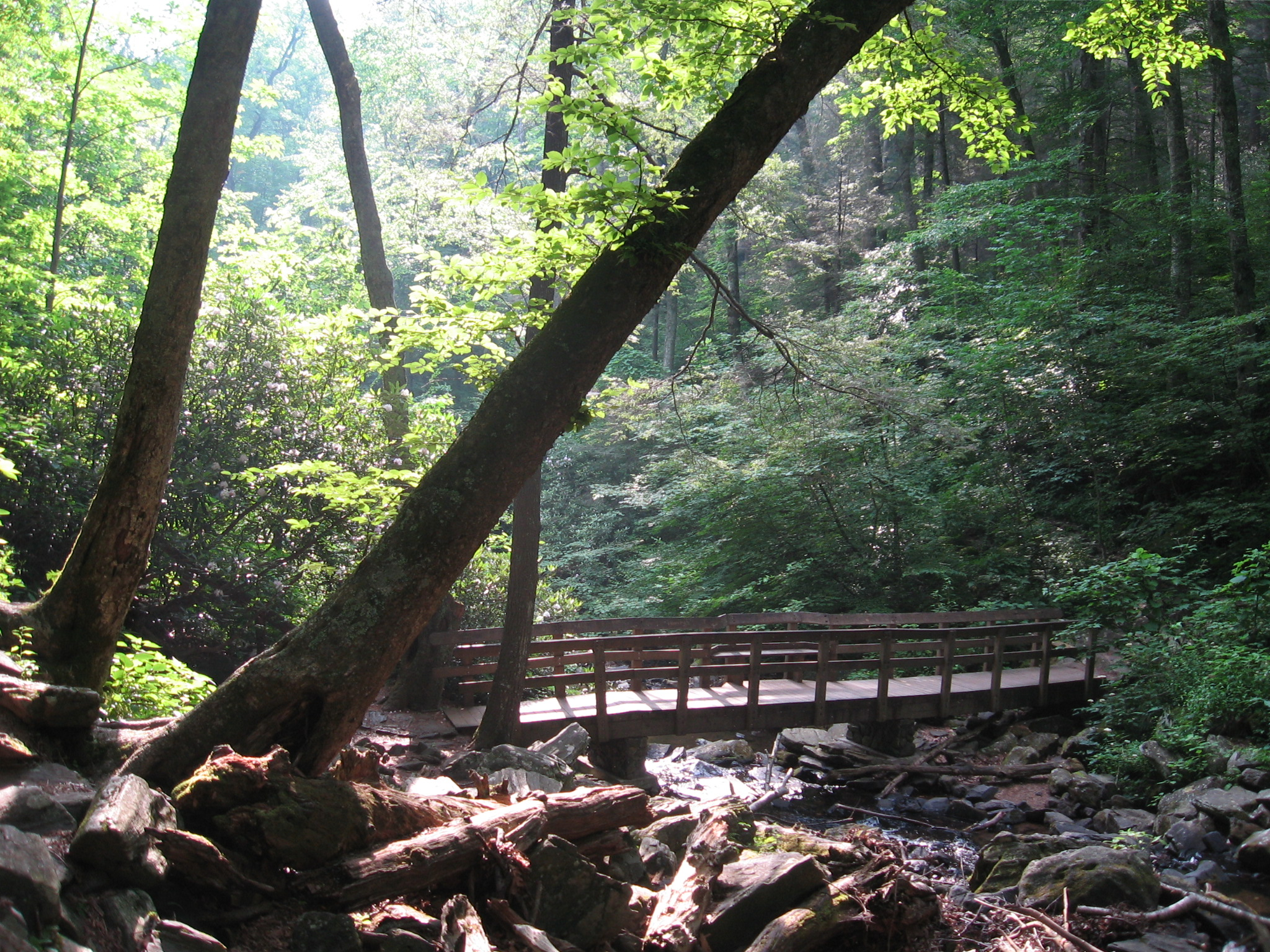
Foot Bridge

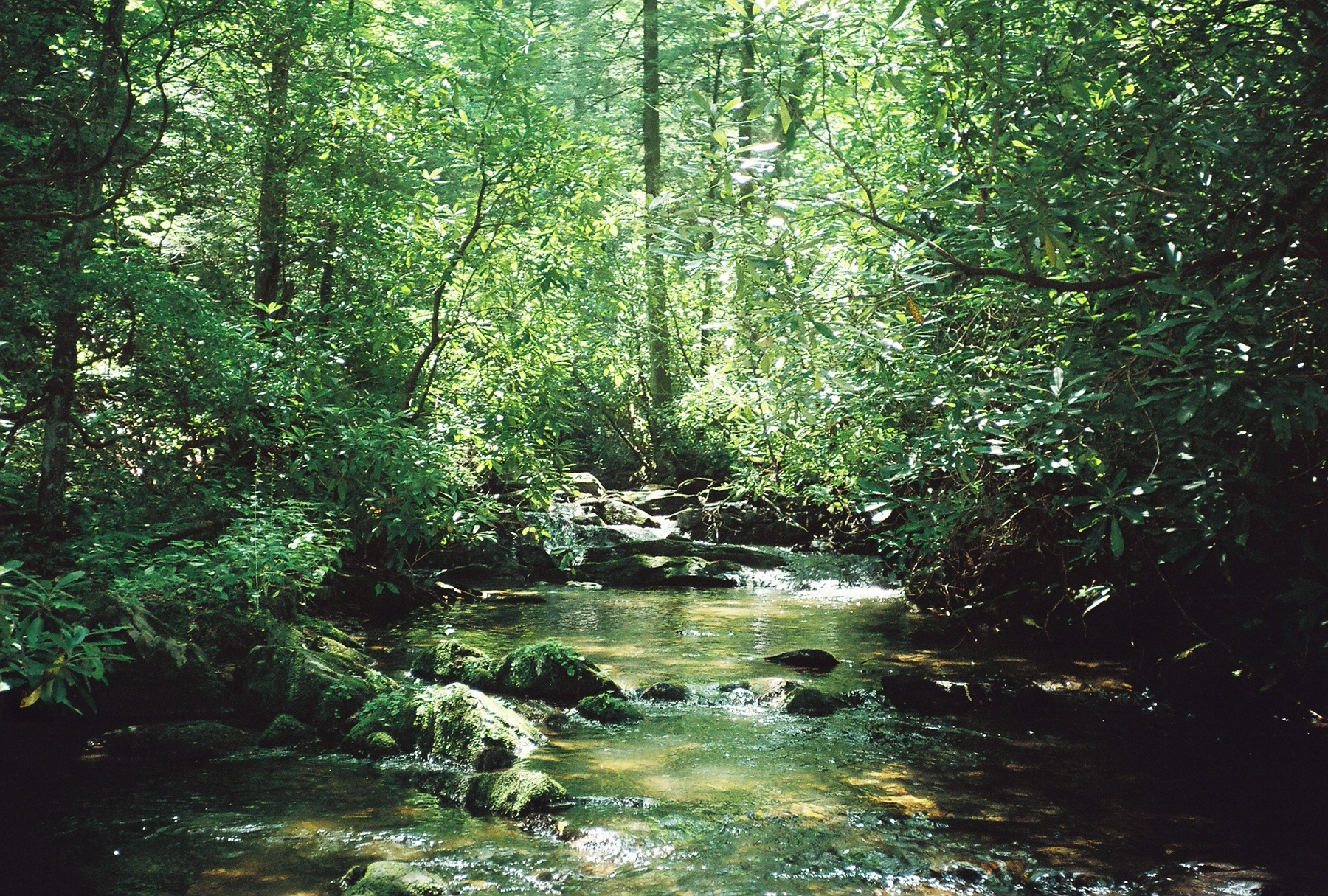
Crabtree Creek Upstream

== See also ==
- List of waterfalls
- List of waterfalls in North Carolina
