= Log Hollow Falls =

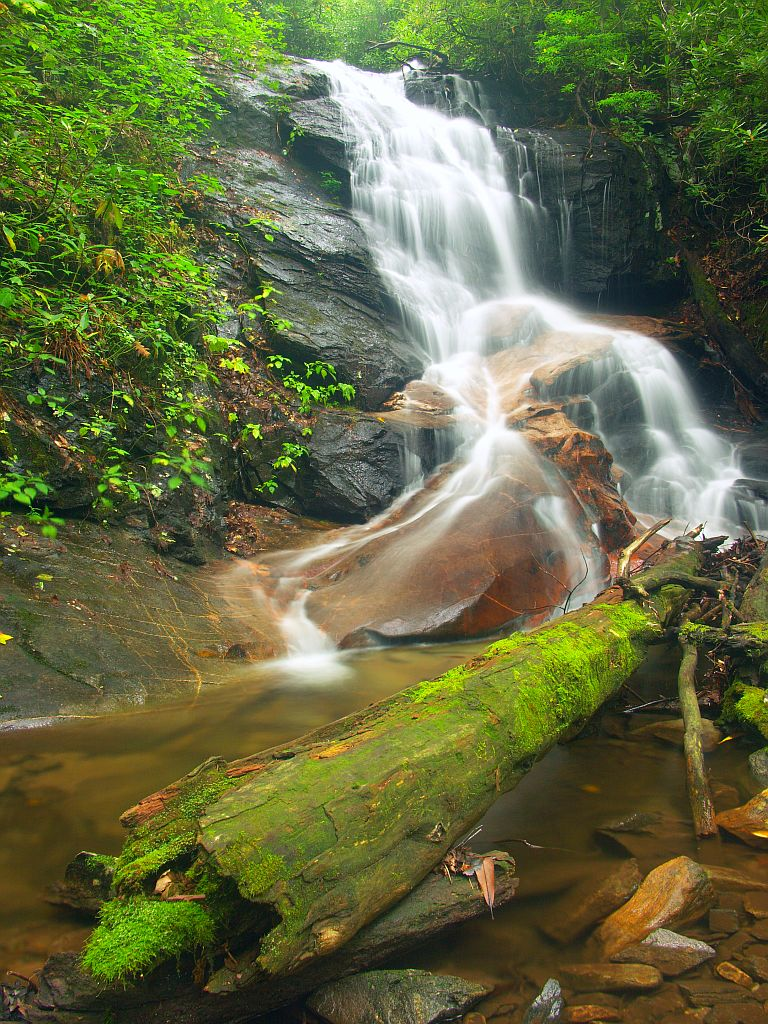
- Interactive map of Log Hollow Falls
- Location: Blue Ridge Mountains, Transylvania County, North Carolina
- Coordinates: 35.323662°N 82.808118°W
- Type: Cascade
- Total height: 30 ft (9 m)
- Number of drops: 1

Log Hollow Falls (also known as Falls in Log Hollow, or the Falls on Log Hollow Creek) is a waterfall in the Pisgah National Forest, Transylvania County, North Carolina. It's a steep cascade with a couple of sections of free falling water. Visitors can drive to within 1/2 miles of the falls, and access them via an old Forest Service logging road, making it an easy destination. Despite this, the falls are not very well known and receives few visitors.

== See also ==
- List of waterfalls
- List of waterfalls in North Carolina
