= The Hunger Games: The Ballad of Songbirds & Snakes (soundtrack) =

The Hunger Games: The Ballad of Songbirds & Snakes (Music from & Inspired by)

Soundtrack album by various artists
- Released: November 17, 2023
- Recorded: 2022–2023
- Studios: Air Studios, London
- Genres: Americana; folk; country
- Label: Geffen
- Producer: Various

Singles from The Hunger Games: The Ballad of Songbirds & Snakes
- 1. "The Hanging Tree" Released: October 20, 2023; 2. "Can't Catch Me Now" Released: November 3, 2023; 3. "The Old Therebefore" Released: February 9, 2024

The Hunger Games: The Ballad of Songbirds & Snakes (Music from & Inspired by) is the soundtrack album to the 2023 film of the same name, based on Suzanne Collins's 2020 novel The Ballad of Songbirds and Snakes. The fifth installment in The Hunger Games film series and prequel to the first film, it stars Tom Blyth, Rachel Zegler, Peter Dinklage, Hunter Schafer, Jason Schwartzman, Josh Andrés Rivera, and Viola Davis.

The soundtrack featured several pop and country folk songs performed by the cast members, including Zegler. The album was released by Geffen Records on November 17, 2023, and was led by two singles—"The Hanging Tree" and "Can't Catch Me Now". A studio version of "The Old Therebefore" was released as the third single on February 9, 2024.

== Background ==
At CinemaCon on April 26, 2023, director Francis Lawrence had announced that Dave Cobb would produce the soundtrack album that featured the prequel's version of songs from the previous installments. As music plays a more prominent role in the prequel, the creative team was heavily influenced by appalachian, country, and folk music. Late country music singer Loretta Lynn also informed Lucy Gray's sound throughout the filming process, and was also involved in providing creative inputs to the team. Zegler performed all the songs in the film live throughout filming.

== Singles ==
On September 16, 2023, Lucy Gray's version of the song "The Hanging Tree" from the 2014 film The Hunger Games: Mockingjay – Part 1 (originally performed by Jennifer Lawrence) was teased in a promotional video for the film. The full song was released on October 20, as the lead single. On November 1, Olivia Rodrigo announced that she would perform a song "Can't Catch Me Now" for the soundtrack of the film, which would be the first track from the album that was made available for pre-order. The song was released as a single two days later. A music video for the track would be released on November 13. A studio version of "The Old Therebefore" by Zegler was released as single on February 9, 2024.

== Reception ==
David Rooney of The Hollywood Reporter said that Cobb's rousing tunes for Lucy Gray's songs "adding fire to the heroine's rebel spirit". Will Sayre of MovieWeb said that the tunes are "catchy enough and will surely be universally appreciated among fans".

== Track listing ==
The track list of the album was announced on November 1, 2023.

All the tracks produced by Dave Cobb, except where noted

The Hunger Games: The Ballad of Songbirds & Snakes (Music from & Inspired by) track listing
No.	Title	Writer(s)	Producer(s)	Length
1.	"Can't Catch Me Now" (Olivia Rodrigo)	Daniel Nigro; Rodrigo	Nigro	3:26
2.	"The Hanging Tree" (Rachel Zegler)	Suzanne Collins; Wesley Schultz		2:24
3.	"Wool" (Flatland Cavalry)	Cleto Cordero		3:49
4.	"Nothing You Can Take from Me" (Zegler)	Dave Cobb; Collins		1:36
5.	"The Garden" (Sierra Ferrell)	Oliver Bates Craven; Ferrell	Eddie Spear; Gary Paczosa	3:42
6.	"The Ballad of Lucy Gray Baird" (Zegler)	Collins; Cobb		2:19
7.	"Bury Me Beneath the Willow" (Molly Tuttle)		Tuttle	3:42
8.	"The Old Therebefore / Singing at Snakes" ( Zegler; James Newton Howard)	Collins; Cobb; Howard	Cobb; Howard; Michael Dean Parsons	2:49
9.	"Burn Me Once" (Bella White)	White	White	3:20
10.	"District 12 Stomp" (The Covey Band)	Cobb		0:43
11.	"Nothing You Can Take from Me (Boot-Stompin' Version)" ( Zegler; The Covey Band)	Collins; Cobb		3:14
12.	"Cabin Song" (Billy Strings)	William Apostal	Jon Brion	3:27
13.	"Lucy Gray (Part 1)" (Zegler)	William Wordsworth		2:41
14.	"Pure as the Driven Snow" ( Zegler; the Covey Band)	Collins; Cobb		3:53
15.	"Winter's Come and Gone" (Charles Wesley Godwin)	David Rawlings; Gillian Welch	Charles Wesley Godwin	2:49
16.	"Keep on the Sunny Side" ( Josie Hope Hall; the Covey Band)	Ada Blenkhorn; J. Howard Entwisle		2:44
17.	"Lucy Gray Part 2" (Zegler)	Wordsworth		3:19
Total length:				49:56

Notes

- Vinyl editions of the album omit both parts of "Lucy Gray".
- Stylistically in the vinyl edition, tracks 1–7 are grouped under Songbirds while tracks 8–16 are grouped under Snakes.

== Charts ==
=== Weekly charts ===
Weekly chart performance for The Hunger Games: The Ballad of Songbirds & Snakes (Music From & Inspired By)
Chart (2023–2024)	Peak position
Australian Albums (ARIA)	95
Belgian Albums (Ultratop Flanders)	45
Canadian Albums (Billboard)	45
Croatian International Albums (HDU)	30
Dutch Albums (Album Top 100)	68
French Albums (SNEP)	128
Lithuanian Albums (AGATA)	31
New Zealand Albums (RMNZ)	22
Norwegian Albums (VG-lista)	11
UK Compilation Albums (Official Charts)	10
UK Americana Albums (Official Charts)	2
UK Soundtrack Albums (Official Charts)	1
US Billboard 200	68
US Top Country Albums (Billboard)	15
US Soundtrack Albums (Billboard)	3

=== Year-end charts ===
Year-end chart performance for The Hunger Games: The Ballad of Songbirds & Snakes (Music From & Inspired By)
Chart (2024)	Position
US Top Country Albums (Billboard)	62
US Soundtrack Albums (Billboard)	22

== Accolades ==
Accolades for The Hunger Games: The Ballad of Songbirds & Snakes (Music From & Inspired By)
Award	Date of Ceremony	Category	Recipient(s)	Result	Ref
Hollywood Music in Media Awards	November 15, 2023	Original Song — Sci-Fi/Fantasy Film	"Can't Catch Me Now" Written by Dan Nigro and Olivia Rodrigo; performed by Olivia Rodrigo	Won	
Society of Composers & Lyricists Awards	February 13, 2024	Outstanding Original Song for a Dramatic or Documentary Visual Media Production	"Can't Catch Me Now" Written by Dan Nigro and Olivia Rodrigo; performed by Olivia Rodrigo	Won	
