= The Hunger Games 4 =

The Hunger Games 4 may refer to:

- The Hunger Games: Mockingjay – Part 2
- The Ballad of Songbirds and Snakes
- The Hunger Games: The Ballad of Songbirds & Snakes
