= Can't Catch Me Now =

Single by Olivia Rodrigo

from the album The Hunger Games: The Ballad of Songbirds & Snakes
- Released: November 3, 2023
- Genre: Folk rock; chamber-folk
- Length: 3:25
- Label: Geffen
- Songwriters: Olivia Rodrigo; Dan Nigro
- Producer: Dan Nigro

Olivia Rodrigo singles chronology
"Get Him Back!" (2023)	"Can't Catch Me Now" (2023)	"Obsessed" (2024)

The Hunger Games singles chronology
"The Hanging Tree" (Lucy Gray's Version) (2023)	"Can't Catch Me Now" (2023)	"Draw You Out" (2026)

Music video
- "Can't Catch Me Now" on YouTube

"Can't Catch Me Now" is a song by American singer-songwriter Olivia Rodrigo from the soundtrack to the 2023 American dystopian action film The Hunger Games: The Ballad of Songbirds & Snakes. Rodrigo co-wrote the song with its producer, Dan Nigro. Geffen Records released it as the soundtrack's second single on November 3, 2023. A folk rock and chamber-folk ballad driven by acoustic guitars, the song has lyrics about vengeance and the narrator's inescapable presence in the subject's life, inspired by the film's plot.

Music critics praised Rodrigo's ability to make folk-influenced music and her vocal performance on "Can't Catch Me Now", comparing its sound to the ballads on her own albums. The song received several awards and nominations, including winning Hollywood Music in Media and Gold List awards. It was nominated for Best Song Written for Visual Media at the 67th Annual Grammy Awards and was shortlisted for Best Original Song at the 96th Academy Awards. In the United States, the song debuted at number 56 on the Billboard Hot 100. It reached the top 30 in Australia, Ireland, Lithuania, New Zealand, and the United Kingdom.

Leonn Ward directed the music video for "Can't Catch Me Now", which intersperses scenes from The Hunger Games: The Ballad of Songbirds & Snakes with clips of Rodrigo singing the song in a cabin and a grass field. She performed the song at the KIIS-FM Jingle Ball and on The Late Show with Stephen Colbert. Rodrigo included it on the set list for some dates of her 2024 concert tour, the Guts World Tour. Kelly Clarkson performed a cover version of the song for The Kelly Clarkson Show in April 2024.

== Background and release ==
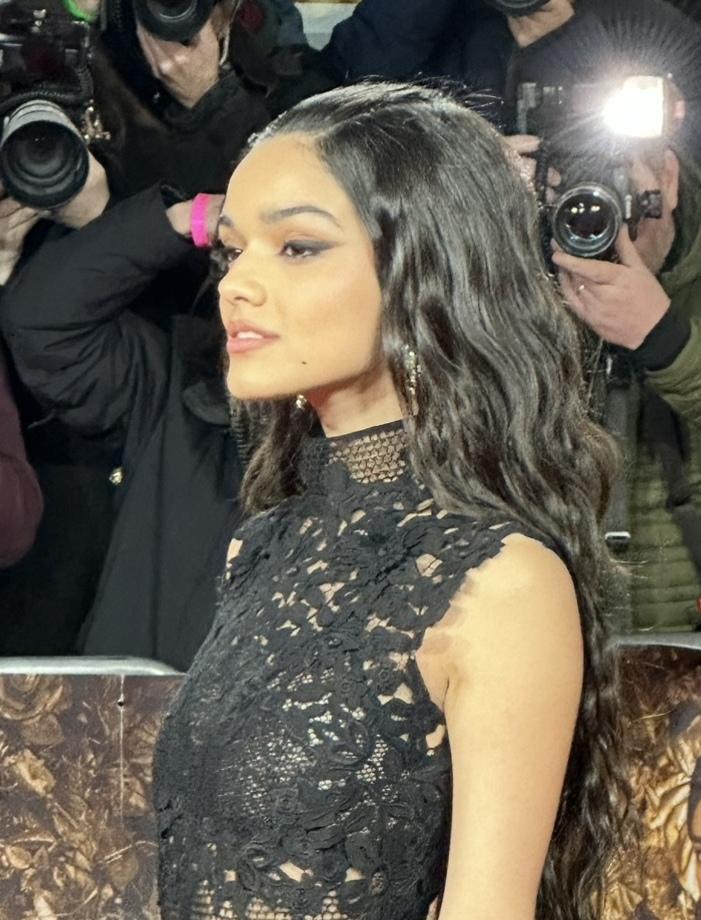
"Can't Catch Me Now" is written from the perspective of Lucy Gray Baird, portrayed by Rachel Zegler (pictured in 2023).

Dan Nigro – the sole producer of Olivia Rodrigo's debut studio album, Sour (2021) – returned as her principal collaborator on the follow-up album, Guts (2023). It included some indie folk songs, with lyrical themes like heartbreak, body image, and social and adolescent anxieties. The album was released to critical acclaim in September 2023. The songs on the albums were autobiographical, reflecting Rodrigo's approach to songwriting like a diary entry.

In 2022, Rodrigo was approached to preview the American dystopian action film The Hunger Games: The Ballad of Songbirds & Snakes and potentially write music inspired by it. A fan of the books and the soundtracks from the franchise, she considered it "such an honor". Rodrigo was stimulated by one of the final scenes in the movie, an aerial view of birds weaving in and out among trees, which she kept thinking about repeatedly and believed was the "climax". She felt a connection to the character Lucy Gray Baird, portrayed by Rachel Zegler; Rodrigo and Nigro wrote the song "Can't Catch Me Now" from her perspective, with the intention of capturing the scene. Rodrigo enjoyed the challenge of writing from a movie character's point of view, describing it as "sort of acting" and "character work", but she also believed parts of the song were about herself: "I think I injected parts of myself into it too. I saw bits of myself in her; I admired her resilience, so I tried to embody all that and put it into the song." Nigro nudged her to experiment with new musical styles on it as well.

On November 1, 2023, Rodrigo's hotline began playing a short clip of "Can't Catch Me Now" on repeat. The same day, Lionsgate announced that the track would serve as the official song for the film, at a promotional event in Times Square which was attended by its actors Zegler, Tom Blyth, and Josh Andrés Rivera. Alongside a 60-second trailer of The Hunger Games: The Ballad of Songbirds & Snakes, which featured the song, Rodrigo revealed it would be released two days later and expressed her excitement about the opportunity to write for the film. Geffen Records made "Can't Catch Me Now" available for pre-order as the opening track on the film's accompanying 2023 soundtrack album, from which it served as the second single. The song was also released on the 7-inch vinyl format on November 3.

== Composition and lyrics ==
"Can't Catch Me Now"
"Can't Catch Me Now" is a folk rock and chamber-folk song with acoustic guitar instrumentation, strings, and harmonies. Its intensity escalates during the titular line (sampled).

"Can't Catch Me Now" is 3 minutes and 25 seconds long. Nigro produced and mixed the song, and he engineered it with Dylan Waterhouse. Nigro played guitar, keyboards, bass, and Mellotron; Paul Cartwright conducted the string arrangement and played viola and violin; and Chappell Roan provided the background vocals. Randy Merrill mastered the song.

"Can't Catch Me Now" is a folk rock and chamber-folk ballad driven by acoustic guitar instrumentation. The song opens with that instrument as the sole accompaniment to Rodrigo's voice and subsequently includes strings. She harmonizes with herself on it, which Stereogum's Chris DeVille described as "piercing". "Can't Catch Me Now" employs a melody which gradually rises to a slow crescendo, and the intensity escalates when Rodrigo belts the titular line over orchestral instrumentation: "You can't, you can't catch me now." Her voice ascends while singing the line "Coming like a storm into your town." (Note: The lyric is "Coming like a storm into your town" according to the official lyric video.) The song ramps up and reaches an intense climax, after which Rodrigo sings the final line with "an open, unresolved cadence", according to Consequence's Carys Anderson and Jo Vito.

The lyrics of "Can't Catch Me Now" are written from Lucy Gray Baird's perspective, inspired by the plot of The Hunger Games: The Ballad of Songbirds & Snakes. They are about vengeance and the narrator's inescapable presence in the subject's life. The first verse describes scenes like snowfall and mountains, as the narrator wonders that the subject probably expected them to become less furious over time. In the chorus, they taunt the subject that, despite being everywhere, the latter would not be able to capture them: "But I'm in the trees, I'm in the breeze / My footsteps on the ground / You'll see my face in every place / But you can't catch me now." Rodrigo then sings "Coming like a storm into your town", which Steffanee Wang of Nylon interpreted as a reference to Lucy Gray Baird. During the song's conclusion, Rodrigo alludes to the film again: "Yeah, sometimes the fire you founded / Don't burn the way you'd expect / Yeah, you thought that this was the end."

== Critical reception ==
Music critics were positive about "Can't Catch Me Now" and believed its folk-influenced production suited Rodrigo. Vanity Fair's Rob Ledonne described the song as emotional and compelling, noting that it showcased her talent in folk music and marked "one more step towards Rodrigo's world domination". Alex Hopper of American Songwriter believed it was alluring, shocking, and "one of her most interesting songs to date". Though he thought "Can't Catch Me Now" represented a change in Rodrigo's sound, it also felt natural of her and Nigro.

Critics believed "Can't Catch Me Now" resembled the ballads on her own albums, and Billboard's Jason Lipshutz opined it formed an earnest addition to the soundtrack and her discography. Some reviewers, like Anderso, Vito, and The New Zealand Herald's Alana Rae, praised Rodrigo's vocal performance. Liberty Dunworth of NME called her voice "haunting", and Wang believed it "soars into the treetops". Ledonne, Anderson, and Vito thought the melodies were luxurious, and others described the acoustic instrumentation as intense.

=== Accolades ===
"Can't Catch Me Now" received awards and nominations. The song won the 2023 Hollywood Music in Media Award for Best Original Song in a Sci-Fi, Fantasy or Horror Film, and in 2024, the Gold List award for Best Original Song and the Society of Composers and Lyricists Award for Outstanding Original Song for a Dramatic or Documentary Visual Media Production. It received nominations for Best Original Song at the 2023 North Carolina Film Critics Association and the 2024 Gold Derby Film Awards, as well as the 2024 Guild of Music Supervisors Award for Best Song Written and/or Recording Created for a Film and Best Song Written for Visual Media at the 67th Annual Grammy Awards. "Can't Catch Me Now" was shortlisted for Best Original Song at the 96th Academy Awards, but it was not nominated.

== Commercial performance ==
"Can't Catch Me Now" debuted at number 56 on the US Billboard Hot 100 issued for November 18, 2023. In Canada, the song peaked at number 42 on the Canadian Hot 100 issued for December 2, 2023, and was certified platinum by Music Canada. It reached number 12 on the UK Singles Chart. "Can't Catch Me Now" received a gold certification in the United Kingdom from the British Phonographic Industry, and the Official Charts Company declared it her 16th-biggest song in the country in February 2024.

In Australia, "Can't Catch Me Now" charted at number 23 and was certified platinum by the Australian Recording Industry Association (ARIA) for selling 70,000 equivalent units. The song entered at number 15 in New Zealand and received a platinum certification from Recorded Music NZ. It peaked at number 43 on the Billboard Global 200. "Can't Catch Me Now" also reached the top 50 at number 5 in Ireland, number 25 in Lithuania, number 37 in Norway, number 44 in the Czech Republic, number 45 in the Netherlands, and number 50 in Slovakia. The song received gold certifications in Belgium, Brazil, France, and Poland.

== Music video ==
Leonn Ward directed the music video for "Can't Catch Me Now", which was released on November 13, 2023. The cinematic video intersperses clips of Rodrigo with scenes from The Hunger Games: The Ballad of Songbirds & Snakes. It begins with a camera tracking shot being guided inside an isolated cabin, where she performs the song on a guitar while perched on a bed. After strolling through the cabin, Rodrigo leaves it and runs through a field of grass in a white dress during the bridge. She also sings the chorus during this sequence: "You'll see my face in every place / But you can't catch me now." Scenes depicting Blyth and Zegler portraying their characters play out simultaneously. In the final scene, sunlight falls upon Rodrigo.

== Live performances and other usage ==
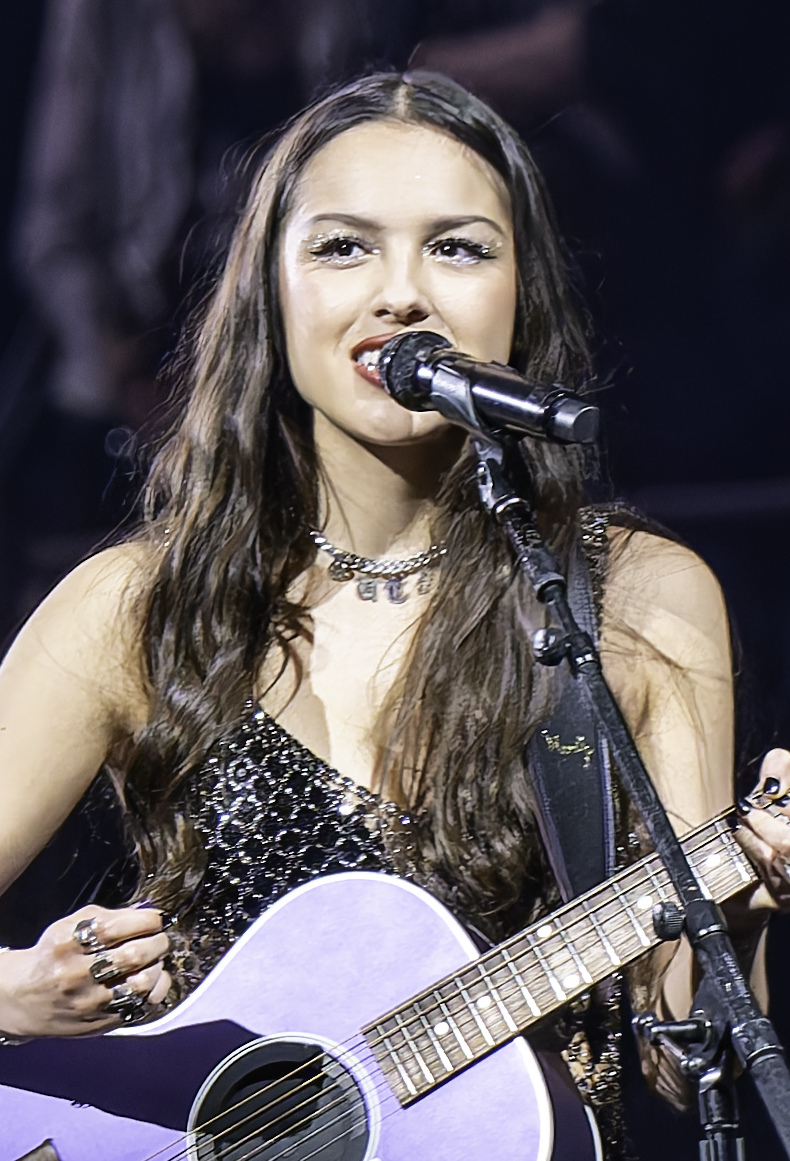
Rodrigo performing on the Guts World Tour in May 2024

Rodrigo performed "Can't Catch Me Now" live for the first time at the KIIS-FM Jingle Ball on December 1, 2023. USA Today's KiMi Robinson remarked that even though the song was only a month old at the time, the fans sang along as if it had been out for much longer, and iHeartRadio's Sarah Tate thought it "continued to build energy and defiance" during her set. Ten days later, Rodrigo reprised the song on The Late Show with Stephen Colbert. Clad in a white slip dress, she initially sat on a stool amidst bare trees and a fog-covered set before standing to deliver the chorus with a backing band of four musicians and singers in the shadows. Gil Kaufman of Billboard believed the theater was filled with electrifying pop energy. Rodrigo included the song on the set list for some dates of her 2024 concert tour, the Guts World Tour. Miami New Times's Celia Almeida considered it a highlight of the show.

Kelly Clarkson covered "Can't Catch Me Now" on The Kelly Clarkson Show on April 25, 2024, in an olive green cargo dress with her hair styled in soft waves. She was supported by a vocalist providing harmonies and a team of instrumentalists. Writing for Billboard, Rania Aniftos described it as "flawlessly delivered".

== Credits and personnel ==
Credits are adapted from Qobuz.

- Dan Nigro – producer, songwriter, mixing, engineer, guitar, keyboards, bass, Mellotron
- Olivia Rodrigo – songwriter
- Paul Cartwright – string arrangement, viola, violin
- Dylan Waterhouse – engineer
- Chappell Roan – background vocals
- Randy Merrill – mastering

== Charts ==
=== Weekly charts ===
Weekly chart performance
Chart (2023–2024)	Peak position
Australia (ARIA)	23
Austria (Ö3 Austria Top 40)	66
Canada Hot 100 (Billboard)	42
Czech Republic Singles Digital (ČNS IFPI)	44
France (SNEP)	100
Germany (GfK)	83
Greece International (IFPI)	67
Global 200 (Billboard)	43
Ireland (IRMA)	5
Lithuania (AGATA)	25
Netherlands (Single Top 100)	45
Netherlands (Tipparade)	3
New Zealand (Recorded Music NZ)	15
Norway (VG-lista)	37
Poland (Polish Streaming Top 100)	57
Portugal (AFP)	97
Slovakia Singles Digital (ČNS IFPI)	50
Sweden (Sverigetopplistan)	82
Switzerland (Schweizer Hitparade)	56
UK Singles (Official Charts)	12
US Billboard Hot 100	56

=== Year-end charts ===
Year-end chart performance
Chart (2023)	Position
UK Vinyl Singles (OCC)	17

== Certifications ==
Certifications
Region	Certification	Certified units/sales
Australia (ARIA)	2× Platinum	140,000^{‡}
Austria (IFPI Austria)	Gold	15,000^{‡}
Belgium (BRMA)	Gold	20,000^{‡}
Brazil (Pro-Música Brasil)	Diamond	160,000^{‡}
Canada (Music Canada)	Platinum	80,000^{‡}
France (SNEP)	Gold	100,000^{‡}
New Zealand (RMNZ)	Platinum	30,000^{‡}
Poland (ZPAV)	Gold	25,000^{‡}
United Kingdom (BPI)	Platinum	600,000^{‡}
^{‡} Sales+streaming figures based on certification alone.

== Release history ==
Release dates and formats
Region	Date	Format(s)	Label	Ref.
Various	November 3, 2023	Digital download; streaming	Geffen	
Spain	November 3, 2023	7-inch	Universal	
Netherlands	November 10, 2023	7-inch	Universal	
United States	Unknown	7-inch	Geffen	
United Kingdom	December 22, 2023	7-inch	Polydor	
