= Bella White =

Canadian-American singer-songwriter (born 2000)

- Born: Isabel Farley White; July 15, 2000 (age 26); Calgary, Alberta, Canada
- Genres: Americana; bluegrass; folk
- Occupations: Singer; songwriter
- Label: Rounder
- Website: bellawhitemusic.com

Isabel Farley White (born July 15, 2000), better known under her stage name Bella White, is a Canadian-American singer-songwriter and guitarist from Calgary, Alberta. Known for her work in Americana and bluegrass music, she has been recognized for blending traditional Appalachian music with contemporary songwriting. White has released three full-length albums and is signed to Rounder Records.

== Early life and background ==
Born and raised in Calgary, Alberta, White was introduced to traditional music by her father, a Virginia native who played in bluegrass bands. After learning to play banjo and guitar around the age of 12, she began performing at family gatherings and open mic sessions. After completing high school in 2018, she moved from Calgary to Boston to pursue songwriting and music.

== Career ==
White released her debut album, Just Like Leaving, independently in 2020, recorded in Vermont and produced by Patrick M’Gonigle. The album received critical acclaim, with Rolling Stone describing her songwriting as "sublime Appalachian heartbreak." It was later reissued by Rounder Records in 2021.

Her second album, Among Other Things (2023), was produced by Jonathan Wilson at Fivestarstudios in Topanga, California and released by Rounder Records. The album received favorable reviews from outlets including PopMatters and Americana Highways.

White made her debut at the Grand Ole Opry in April 2023. Her song “Burn Me Once” appears on The Hunger Games: The Ballad of Songbirds & Snakes (Geffen Records, 2023).

In 2024 she released the EP Five for Silver, a collection of cover songs.

White has performed at major music festivals including the Newport Folk Festival and Stagecoach Festival. She has supported acts like Band of Horses and John Craigie, and toured with The Paper Kites, Sierra Ferrell and The Milk Carton Kids.

In 2026 she released her third album, A Sign In The Weather.

== Musical style and influences ==
Critics have described White’s music as blending traditional bluegrass and Appalachian folk with modern Americana and singer-songwriter elements. Her songwriting has been noted for introspective themes and sparse, acoustic arrangements. She has cited influences including Hazel Dickens, Gillian Welch, and Joni Mitchell.

== Discography ==
=== Studio albums ===
- Just Like Leaving (2020; reissued 2021)
- Among Other Things (2023)
- A Sign In The Weather (2026)

=== EPs ===
- Five for Silver (2024; Rounder Records EP)

=== Singles ===
- “Burn Me Once” – on The Hunger Games: The Ballad of Songbirds & Snakes (Geffen Records, 2023)
