= The Hanging Tree (The Hunger Games song) =

2014 song composed by James Newton Howard

Single by James Newton Howard featuring Jennifer Lawrence

from the album The Hunger Games: Mockingjay – Part 1
- B-side: "The Mockingjay"
- Released: December 9, 2014
- Genre: Folk
- Length: 3:38
- Label: Republic
- Songwriters: Suzanne Collins; James Newton Howard; Wesley Schultz
- Producer: James Newton Howard

The Hunger Games singles chronology
"Yellow Flicker Beat" (2014)	"The Hanging Tree" (2014)	"Deep in the Meadow" (Baauer remix) (2015)

Audio video
- "The Hanging Tree" on YouTube

"The Hanging Tree" is a song by Suzanne Collins, James Newton Howard, and Wesley Schultz from the band the Lumineers, featuring vocals from American actress Jennifer Lawrence. The song was released by Republic Records on December 9, 2014, as the second single from the soundtrack for The Hunger Games: Mockingjay – Part 1 (2014). It was first included in the film's score album but was later added to the digital extended edition of the film's soundtrack. "The Hanging Tree" is a folk ballad that features orchestral strings and a choir.

"The Hanging Tree" received mostly positive reviews from music critics with some praising Lawrence's vocals, its elements of Appalachian music, and its effectiveness as a murder ballad. Commercially, the song garnered success on charts internationally, peaking atop record charts in several markets, including Austria, Hungary, and Germany. It debuted and peaked at number 12 on the Billboard Hot 100 and at number 20 in the United Kingdom's Official Charts Company. "The Hanging Tree" was eventually certified platinum in Canada and Germany as well as double platinum in the United States. To promote the song, a remix by producer Michael Gazzo was released.

"The Hanging Tree" was also featured in The Hunger Games: The Ballad of Songbirds & Snakes (2023), the film adaptation of the 2020 prequel novel to The Hunger Games. This version was performed by Rachel Zegler as Lucy Gray Baird, and was released as the first single from the film's accompanying soundtrack album.

== Background and release ==
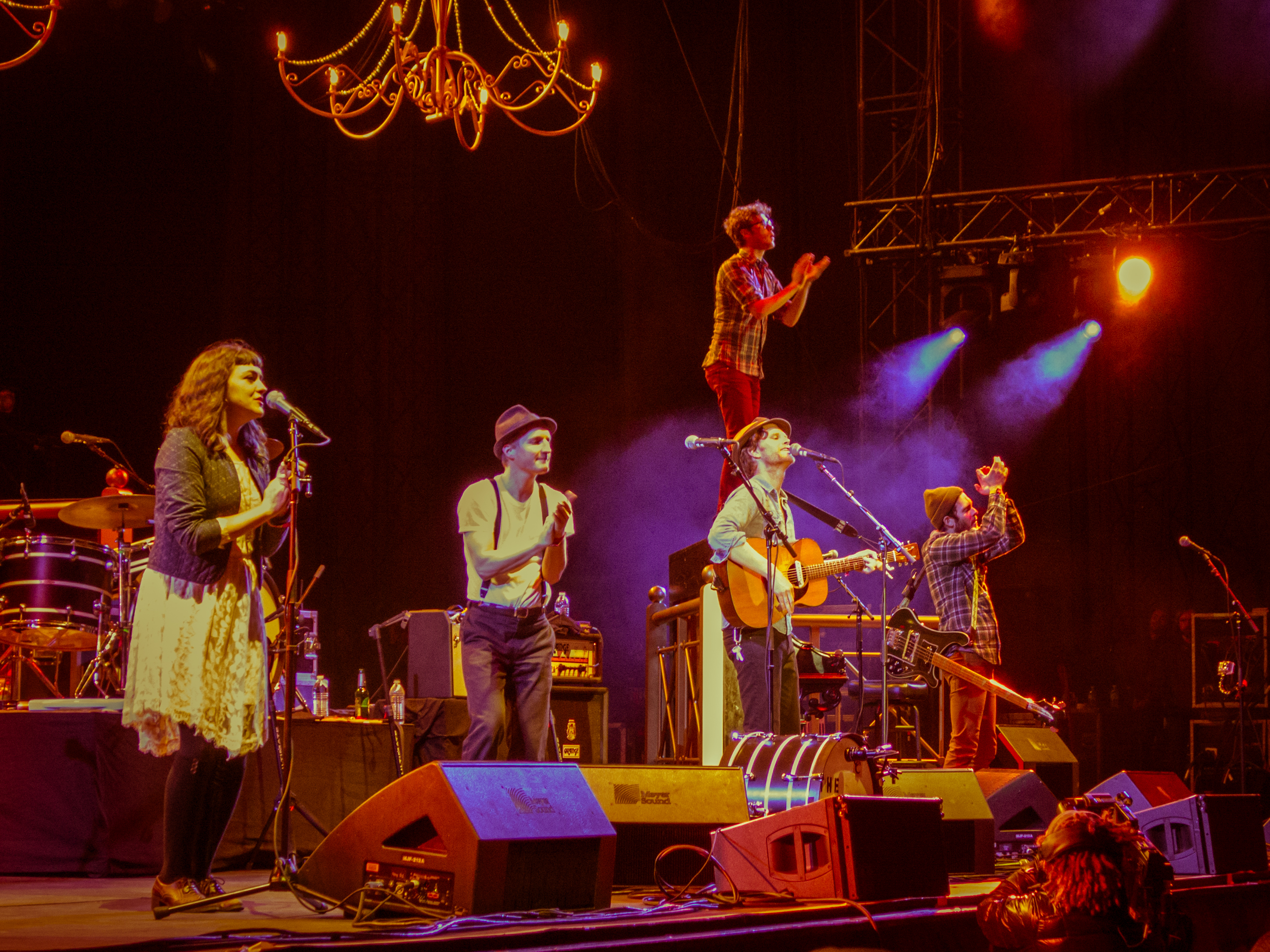
"The Hanging Tree" was composed by members of the indie folk band the Lumineers (pictured).

"The Hanging Tree" was written by Suzanne Collins and originally appeared in her novel Mockingjay (2010); Jeremiah Fraites and Wesley Schultz from American indie folk band the Lumineers composed the track while production was handled by James Newton Howard.

Schultz revealed that director Francis Lawrence instructed him to create a melody that could be "hummed or sung by one person" or "by a thousand people"; he also informed Schultz not to make the song "overly complicated". To Schultz, the song felt like an innocent nursery rhyme despite its dark undertones. Schultz and Fraites then submitted a "couple melodies in about a day and a half or two days" during the month of September 2013. Lawrence later contacted both Schultz and Fraites via text message that the melody was chosen for the film, saying, "It worked out great in the movie. We just shot the scene. [Jennifer] was really nervous but it went great."

The lead protagonist Katniss Everdeen performs the song in the film, which is also heard over the closing credits. Jennifer Lawrence revealed on Late Night with David Letterman that she was anxious about singing the song in the film, citing her fear of "singing in front of other people" as her reason; she also disclosed that she cried on set when filming the scene. According to Francis, Jennifer Lawrence suggested that New Zealand singer Lorde could instead provide vocals and she could lip sync; Francis rejected this idea. In preparation, Francis sent Jennifer Lawrence to a vocal coach, in an effort to provide the actress with confidence; she recorded the scene in front of 150 crew members.

"The Hanging Tree" was released as part of the film's score album on November 24, 2014; it is accompanied by a B-side titled "The Mockingjay". The track does not appear on the original release of the film's soundtrack. However, due to the success of "The Hanging Tree", it was later added to the digital extended edition of the soundtrack as the 15th track. On 9 December 2014, "The Hanging Tree" was released as the second single from the soundtrack. Michael Gazzo released a remix of the song—titled "The Hanging Tree" (Rebel remix)—on 15 December 2014. In an interview with Yahoo! Music, Gazzo commented that despite the track's dark tonality, he envisioned the song "uplifting an entire group of people to rise up. To unite."

A new version of "The Hanging Tree" featuring vocals from American actress Rachel Zegler opened the first trailer to The Hunger Games: The Ballad of Songbirds & Snakes, the film adaptation of the prequel to The Hunger Games, in September 2023. The song was released on October 20, 2023, as the first single from the soundtrack album. Zegler, playing Lucy Gray Baird, sings the song in the film, which was done live on set.

== Composition and use ==
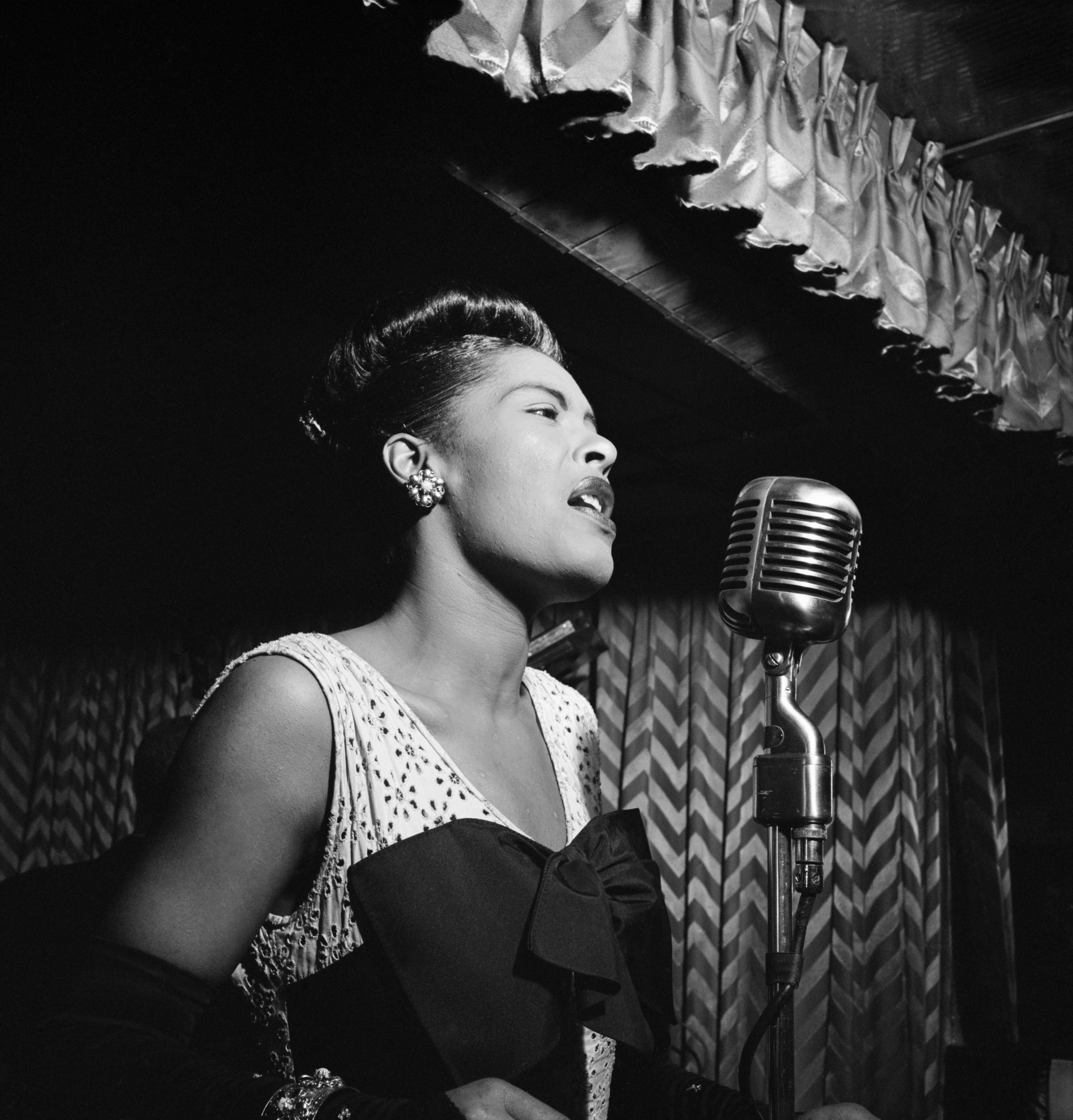
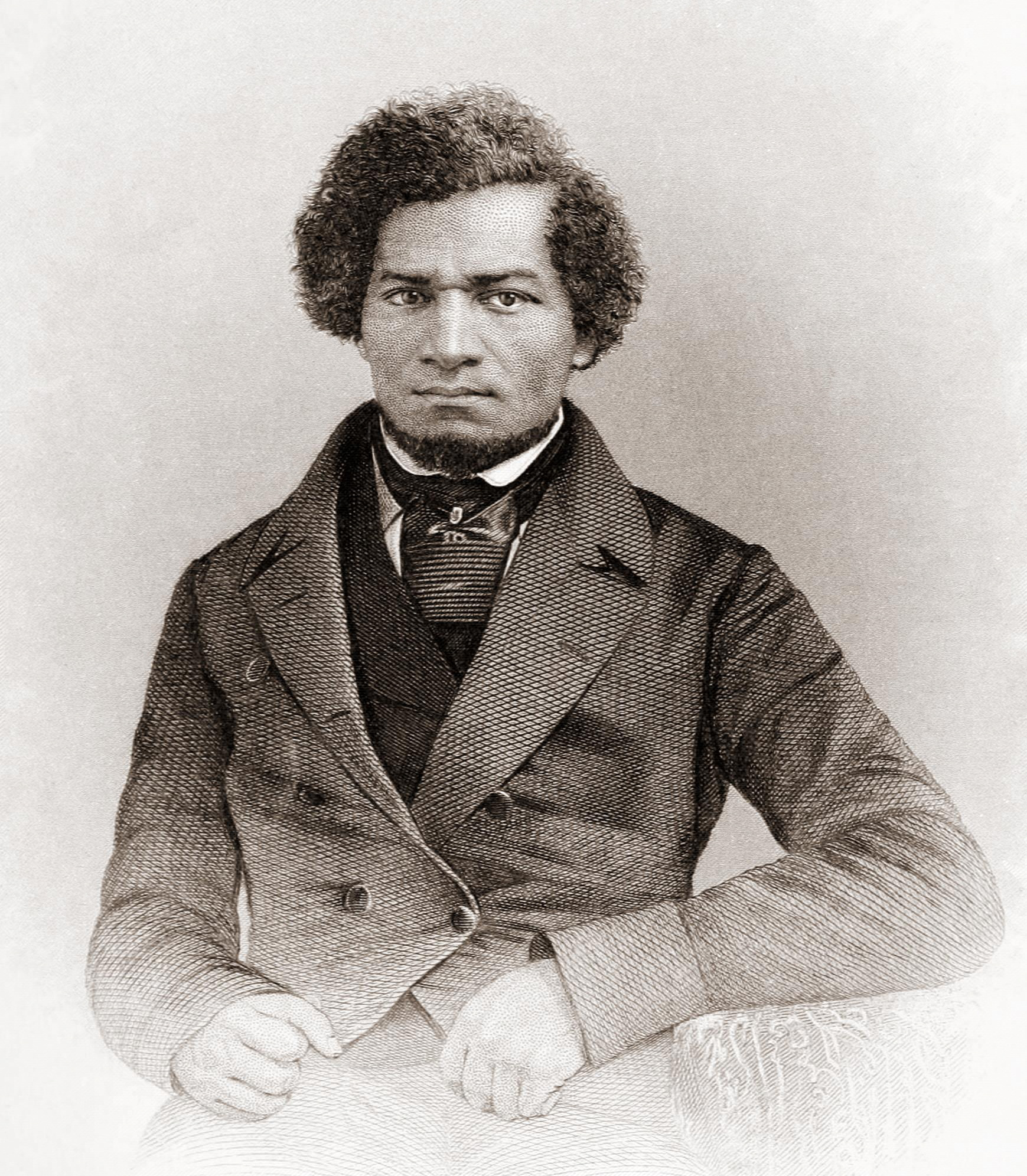
Music critics compared "The Hanging Tree" to "Strange Fruit" by Billie Holiday, and the writings of Frederick Douglass.

"The Hanging Tree" is composed in the key of A minor with a "moderately, somewhat freely" tempo of 88 beats per minute. Lawrence's vocals span a range of E_{3} to E_{4} and its chord progression follows a basic sequence of A5–Am–A^{sus}–F/A. It is a folk ballad, accompanied with orchestral strings and a choir. Chris Payne of The Hollywood Reporter called it a "minimal folk sing-a-long".

WBUR noted that the song's themes represent the tropes of Appalachian music, which commonly used murder themes in their lyrics. "The Hanging Tree" received comparisons to other songs such as "Tom Dooley", Billie Holiday's 1939 ballad "Strange Fruit" (which also includes references to hanging and trees), and the civil rights protest song "We Shall Overcome" as well as a passage from Frederick Douglass's memoir My Bondage and My Freedom (1855) about African-American spirituals. In the film, Lawrence performs the song a cappella. Zegler's version is slower and features a guitar, more in the style of a lullaby.

In the novel's context, it is a song that Katniss learned from her father, and is used as a battle cry. Katniss's mother prohibited the use of the song in her home after hearing Katniss and her sister Primrose chant the song while making necklaces. Peeta Mellark, Katniss's love interest, associates "The Hanging Tree" with her father; Peeta heard her father sing the song once when he traded goods at Peeta's parents' bakery.

In the novel, Haymitch Abernathy says that the song was the first memory Peeta associated with Katniss that did not trigger a "mental breakdown" after the Capitol propagandized him. After realizing this, Katniss uses "The Hanging Tree" as a remedy for Peeta's "Capitol-implanted hatred". She reminds herself of the song once more after Peeta tells her to kill him, in an effort to prevent himself from harming members of their rescue team due to how the Capitol "reprogrammed" him. In the adaption, however, Plutarch Heavensbee uses the film of Katniss singing as anti-Capitol propaganda and changes the lyrics from "necklace of rope" to "necklace of hope" to reduce some of the macabre undertones in the original song. Plutarch then uses the song as a rebel anthem, which prompts people from the districts to destroy a hydroelectric dam that the Capitol relies on.

In the prequel novel The Ballad of Songbirds and Snakes (2020), the song is revealed to have been penned by Lucy Gray Baird, the first Hunger Games victor from District 12. According to Zegler, who plays Lucy Gray, the character is "a performer forced to fight" in contrast to Katniss, "a fighter forced to perform". Lucy Gray witnesses the execution of Arlo Chance at a hanging tree after he is accused of killing two Peacekeepers and a coal mine boss. His lover is arrested for protesting his innocence.

Coriolanus Snow hears Lucy Gray singing "The Hanging Tree" with a guitar as they reunite in a field in District 12. Their romance mirrors the song, as they meet up at the hanging tree to flee Panem. Lucy Gray is aware Snow is responsible for two deaths but runs away from him after realizing he is responsible for a third. This parallels the description of Chance's execution: "they strung up a man they say murdered three". She sings the song as she runs, leading mockingjays to repeat it.

== Reception and promotion ==
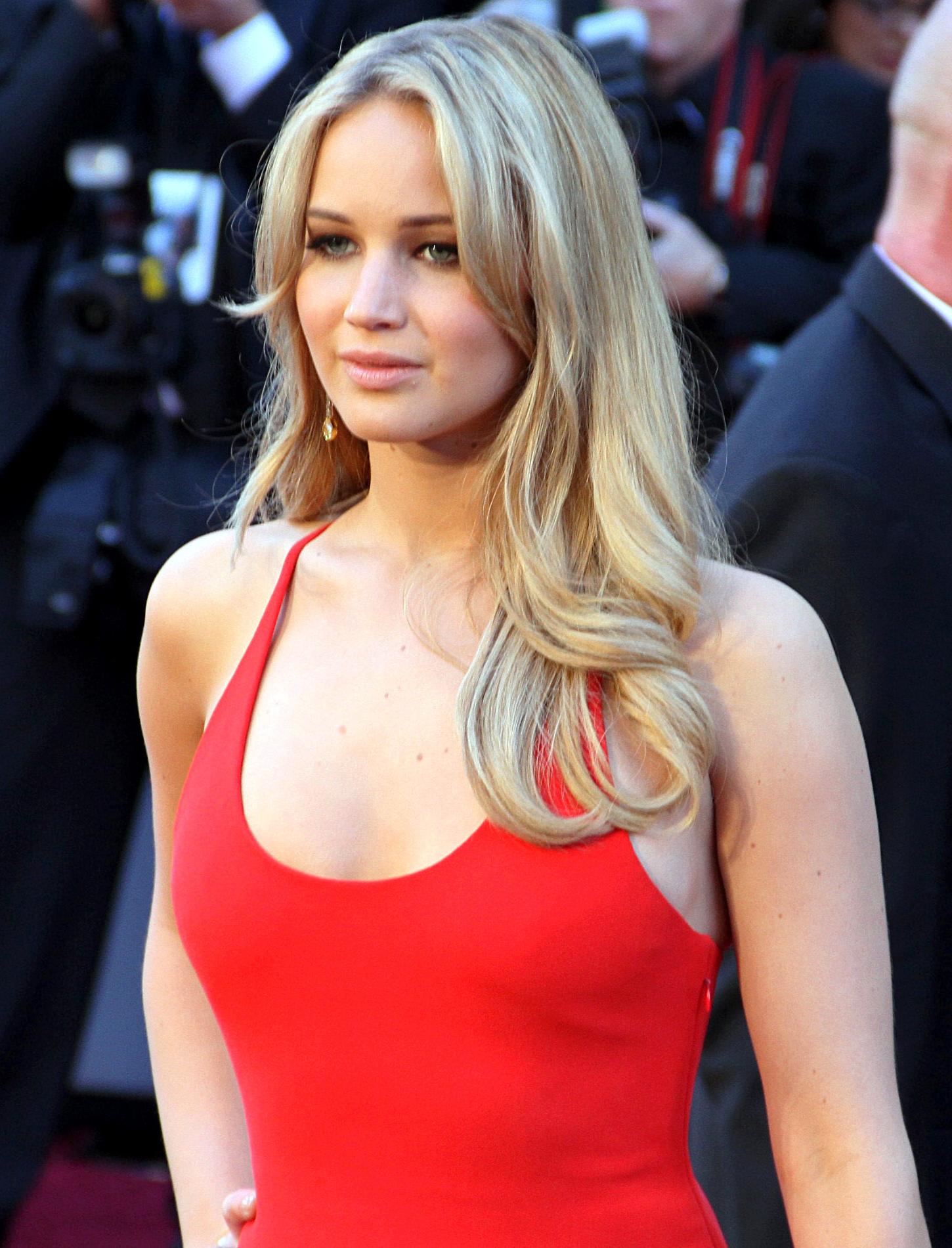
With "The Hanging Tree", Jennifer Lawrence (pictured) became one of 13 Academy Award recipients to chart on the Billboard Hot 100.

"The Hanging Tree" received positive reviews from music critics, with several critics complimenting its effectiveness as a murder ballad. Jeff Baker, writing for OregonLive.com called the song the best part of the film. Baker complimented Lawrence for turning the track into a "murder ballad that calls back to her Kentucky roots". Stereogum writer Gabriella Tully Claymore called it a "creepy-as-hell take on classic Americana murder ballads". Stephanie Merry from The Washington Post praised Lawrence's vocal delivery, commenting that her "raspy voice [matches] the dark narrative and Appalachian style of the music". Petrana Radulovic from Polygon believed that the marketing of the film and the club remix of "The Hanging Tree" contradicted Collins's intended message by focusing on "glitz and glamour" instead of the "sheer horror" of the setting.

"The Hanging Tree" debuted at number 12 on the US Billboard Hot 100 for the week of 13 December 2014 and debuted outside the 50 position (2.1 million U.S. streams) on Streaming Songs, charting at number two (200,000 downloads sold) on Digital Songs and received eight spins on U.S. radio. "The Hanging Tree" became the highest-charting song from The Hunger Games franchise on the chart, surpassing "Eyes Open" by Taylor Swift, which peaked at number 19. Lawrence became one of 13 Academy Award-winning recipients to chart on the Hot 100; the last female Academy Award winner to achieve this feat was Cher with "Believe" (1998). The song peaked at number one in Austria, Germany and Hungary; it peaked in the top five in Australia. It was certified platinum by Music Canada (MC) and double platinum by the Recording Industry Association of America (RIAA).

"The Hanging Tree" was performed live for the first time at "Hollywood in Vienna", a gala honoring excellence in music. James Newton Howard performed with Edita Malovčić as a substitute for Lawrence; it was conducted by Keith Lockhart of the Boston Pops Orchestra. Howard was reportedly in tears after the performance and rose to his feet to give a standing ovation. To promote the song, Howard embarked on a European tour called "3 Decades of Music for Hollywood" and held a contest in search for a female vocalist, one for each tour date, that would sing Lawrence's verses.

=== In popular culture ===
"The Hanging Tree" is played by producers to contestants in the hit British reality television series The Traitors prior to the 'Roundtable' section of the format, with the eeriness of the song used to add tension to the game.

During the Tisza party celebrations of the 2026 election night in Budapest, "The Hanging Tree" was one of the songs played after Péter Magyar's speech. The dance of future health minister Zsolt Hegedűs under the music went viral. The dance was repeated during Magyar's inauguration on May 9th on Kossuth Square, where British singer Jalja (Georgina Revell) performed the song live.

The song has been used in Thailand and Myanmar, respectively in 2014 and 2021 after military coups.in 2026, the song has also became one of the emblems of the 2026 French student movement. In one case The Orchestre du Nouveau Monde "tear-gassed by police in Paris today, forcing them to abandon a planned concert in support of demonstrators." This happened unprovoked as far as reports show thus far.

== Track listing ==
CD single
No.	Title	Length
1.	"The Hanging Tree"	3:38
2.	"The Mockingjay"	2:40

Digital download/streaming – Remix
No.	Title	Length
1.	"The Hanging Tree" (Rebel remix)	2:27

Digital download/streaming
No.	Title	Length
1.	"The Hanging Tree" (from The Hunger Games: The Ballad of Songbirds & Snakes)	2:23

== Personnel ==
Original version

Credits adapted from the liner notes of The Hunger Games: Mockingjay – Part 1 (Original Motion Picture Score).

- Jennifer Lawrence – vocals
- Suzanne Collins – songwriter
- James Newton Howard – producer
- Wesley Schultz – composer
- Jeremiah Fraites – composer

Lucy Gray Baird version

Credits adapted from the liner notes of The Hunger Games: The Ballad of Songbirds & Snakes (Music From & Inspired By).

- Rachel Zegler – vocals
- Dave Cobb – producer
- Molly Tuttle – guitar

== Charts ==
=== Weekly charts ===
Weekly chart performance for "The Hanging Tree" by James Newton Howard
Chart (2014–15)	Peak position
Australia (ARIA)	5
Austria (Ö3 Austria Top 40)	1
Belgium (Ultratop 50 Flanders)	8
Belgium (Ultratop 50 Wallonia)	18
Canada Hot 100 (Billboard)	14
Canada CHR/Top 40 (Billboard)	21
Canada Hot AC (Billboard)	41
Czech Republic Singles Digital (ČNS IFPI)	25
France (SNEP)	23
Germany (GfK)	1
Hungary (Single Top 40)	1
Hungary (Stream Top 40)	32
Ireland (IRMA)	20
Italy (FIMI)	29
Netherlands (Single Top 100)	36
New Zealand (Recorded Music NZ)	9
Norway (VG-lista)	30
Slovakia Singles Digital (ČNS IFPI)	10
Slovenia (SloTop50)	32
Spain (Promusicae)	39
Sweden (Sverigetopplistan)	29
Switzerland (Schweizer Hitparade)	4
UK Singles (Official Charts)	14
US Billboard Hot 100	12
US Adult Contemporary (Billboard)	30
US Adult Pop Airplay (Billboard)	14
US Dance Airplay (Billboard)	19
US Pop Airplay (Billboard)	10

Weekly chart performance for "The Hanging Tree" by Rachel Zegler
Chart (2023)	Peak position
New Zealand Hot Singles (RMNZ)	19

=== Year-end charts ===
Year-end chart performance for "The Hanging Tree"
Chart (2014)	Position
Hungary (Single Top 40)	74

Chart (2015)	Position
Austria (Ö3 Austria Top 40)	22
Canada (Canadian Hot 100)	83
Germany (Official German Charts)	29
US Billboard Hot 100	78

== Certifications ==
Region	Certification	Certified units/sales
Australia (ARIA)	Gold	35,000^{^}
Austria (IFPI Austria)	Gold	15,000^{*}
Canada (Music Canada)	Platinum	80,000^{*}
Denmark (IFPI Danmark)	Gold	30,000^{^}
Germany (BVMI)	Platinum	400,000^{‡}
New Zealand (RMNZ)	Gold	7,500^{*}
Sweden (GLF)	Platinum	40,000^{‡}
United Kingdom (BPI)	Silver	200,000^{‡}
United States (RIAA)	2× Platinum	1,100,000
^{*} Sales figures based on certification alone.^{^} Shipments figures based on certification alone.^{‡} Sales+streaming figures based on certification alone.

== Release history ==
Region	Date	Format	Label	Ref.
United States	December 9, 2014	Contemporary hit radio	Republic	
United States	December 15, 2014	Hot adult contemporary radio	Republic	
German-speaking Europe	December 19, 2014	CD	Republic	
