= Sofia Sanchez (actress) =

Ukrainian-American actress (born 2009)

- Born: 2009 (age 16–17); Ukraine
- Years active: 2015-present
- Website: https://www.sofia-sanchez.com

Sofia Sanchez (born 2009) is a Ukrainian-American actress, advocate, and writer with Down syndrome. She is notable for the 2017 viral video "Down Syndrome Is Not Scary" and portraying the character of Wovey in the 2023 film The Hunger Games: The Ballad of Songbirds and Snakes.

== Life and career ==
Sanchez was born in Ukraine, and was adopted at 16 months of age by American couple Jennifer and Hector Sanchez through the International adoption agency Reece's Rainbow. She has three adoptive older brothers, the youngest of whom, Joaquin, also has Down syndrome. In 2017 at age 7 she received media attention for her viral video "Down Syndrome Is Not Scary", in which she talked about life with the condition with her mother. She attends Whitney High School in Rocklin, California.

Sanchez first acted in a 2015 episode of Switched at Birth. In 2023, she portrayed Wovey in The Hunger Games: The Ballad of Songbirds and Snakes, as well as portraying the title role in the short film For Paloma.

In 2024, Sanchez gave a TEDx Talk, becoming the youngest person with Down syndrome to do so.

Sanchez has also been the subject of three children's books, which were all written by Margaret O’Hair and illustrated by Sofia Cardoso: You Are Enough, You Are Loved, and You Are Brave. The audiobook for You Are Brave, narrated by Sanchez herself, was honored by the 2025 Odyssey Award. A animated series based the books by Gaumont Animation titled Rocket Park was announced in 2022. In October 2023, both You Are Loved and You Are Enough were included in a list of 64 books by Scholastic that schools could choose to omit in their Scholastic book fairs. The policy was reversed later in the same month.

== Filmography ==
=== Film ===
Year	Title	Role	Notes	Ref.
2023	For Paloma	Paloma	Short film	
2023	The Hunger Games: The Ballad of Songbirds and Snakes	Wovey		

=== Television ===
Year	Title	Role	Notes	Ref.
2015	Switched at Birth	Sophie	1 episode	
2022	Monster High	Bunny Earickson	Voice	

== Publications ==
- O'Hair, Margaret; Sanchez, Sofia (2021). You Are Enough. Illustrated by Sofia Cardoso. Scholastic. ISBN 978-1-338-63074-9.
- O'Hair, Margaret (2023). You Are Loved. Illustrated by Sofia Cardoso. Scholastic. ISBN 9781338850079.
- O'Hair, Margaret; Sanchez, Sofia (2024). You Are Brave. Illustrated by Sofia Cardoso. Scholastic. ISBN 9781339026442.
