= Sunrise on the Reaping =

2025 novel by Suzanne Collins

- Author: Suzanne Collins
- Cover artist: Tim O'Brien
- Language: English
- Series: The Hunger Games
- Genre: Science fiction, Dystopian
- Publisher: Scholastic
- Publication date: March 18, 2025
- Publication place: United States
- Pages: 400
- ISBN: 9781546171461
- Preceded by: The Ballad of Songbirds and Snakes
- Followed by: The Hunger Games

Sunrise on the Reaping is a 2025 dystopian novel written by American author Suzanne Collins and the second prequel novel to the original The Hunger Games trilogy, following The Ballad of Songbirds and Snakes (2020). Set 24 years before the events of the first novel, the narrative delves into themes of political manipulation, the power of propaganda, and the complexities of societal control under a totalitarian regime and centers on the 50th Hunger Games (a special Games also referred to as the Second Quarter Quell), in which Haymitch Abernathy was the victor. It was released on March 18, 2025, and published by Scholastic.

A film adaptation was announced to be in production on June 6, 2024, and was released by Lionsgate on November 20, 2026.

== Background ==
=== Development ===
Collins' inspiration was a book by Scottish philosopher David Hume, specifically his ideas of implicit submission and "the easiness with which the many are governed by the few". Questions surrounding the use of propaganda and the power of media narratives also inspired Collins to explore the concept of what is ‘Real or not real?’ in the novel.

Collins chose the title of Sunrise on the Reaping to express Hume's philosophy of the distinction between inductive and deductive reasoning. As conveyed through Haymitch and Lenore Dove's disagreement in the first chapter, Haymitch believed with certainty that the reaping will always be around and resigned himself to it, showing implicit submission, but Lenore Dove argued there can be a future without them as the Hunger Games have only been around for fifty years.

In the novel, Lenore Dove sings sections of "The Goose and the Common", an 18th-century poem about the injustices of land enclosure in England, in reference to the Capitol.

=== Cover art ===
The cover art for Sunrise on the Reaping was designed by Tim O'Brien. Regarding the cover art, VP publisher and editorial director for Scholastic David Levithan stated that “The spiky sun rises on a symbol that will come to mean a lot to Haymitch Abernathy, as well as countless readers. Artist Tim O’Brien has created yet another iconic Hunger Games cover – this one symbolically exploring one of the central themes of the series: how conflicting forces can be connected by their common nature, the songbird and the snake springing from the same source.”

== Plot ==
Haymitch Abernathy lives in Panem's District 12 with his widowed mother and his ten-year-old brother, Sid. Haymitch works for Hattie Meeney, a bootlegger who illegally distills moonshine, to support his family. He regularly sneaks into the woods to meet his girlfriend, Lenore Dove Baird, a member of the Covey, a nomadic musical group forced to settle in District 12.

The 50th Annual Hunger Games reaping is held on Haymitch's sixteenth birthday. To celebrate this milestone anniversary, dubbed the Second Quarter Quell, all districts must provide four tributes instead of the typical two. At the District 12 reaping, a male tribute, Woodbine Chance, attempts to escape but is shot and killed. In the ensuing chaos, Haymitch protects Lenore Dove from Peacekeepers. District 12's tribute escort Drusilla Sickle and Plutarch Heavensbee, a cameraman who appears sympathetic to the tributes, then appoint Haymitch as the substitute tribute, re‐staging the reaping to remove the killing of Chance and subsequent disorder from the Capitol's broadcast. The other District 12 tributes include 18-year-old betting oddsmaker Wyatt Callow, 13-year-old neighbor and "sweetheart" Louella McCoy, and 16-year-old Maysilee Donner, who has a twin sister, Merrilee.

Capitol media dismisses the District 12 tributes as "long shots" immediately after their arrival. During the Tribute Parade, a horse-drawn chariot accident kills Louella. Haymitch defiantly carries her body down the parade route, lays her in front of the tyrannical ruler of Panem, President Snow, and mockingly applauds him. Haymitch is taken to the Heavensbee family estate, where President Snow threatens him with a slow, painful death in the Games, shown to his family in graphic detail, if his defiance continues. To conceal the parade fiasco, Snow replaces Louella with a kidnapped, tortured, and drugged body double, whom the District 12 tributes nickname "Lou Lou." From her dinnertime choice of sesame bread, they deduce she is from District 11.

With no viable District 12 victors, the Capitol randomly assigns the quartet two mentors from other districts, Wiress of District 3 and Mags of District 4. Opposing alliances quickly form; Districts 1, 2, 4 and 5 make up the Career alliance, and the other districts nickname themselves the "Newcomers." During training, Beetee, a former victor cruelly forced to mentor his own son, Ampert, as punishment for rebellious activities, recruits Haymitch into a covert plan to sabotage the arena. Haymitch and Ampert will use smuggled explosives to blow a hole in the arena's underground water tank and flood its computer systems. Plutarch sneaks Haymitch crucial information about the arena's construction and, to gain his trust, arranges a bittersweet farewell call with Lenore Dove. After the Gamemakers give Haymitch a punitive low score for his parade behavior, he adopts a lawless and charismatic "rascal" persona in the tribute interviews to attract sponsors.

The Games commence in a stunningly beautiful arena. Haymitch abandons the Newcomer alliance to carry out his sabotage plan and obtains a backpack filled with charcoal tablets, water, hard-boiled eggs, and potatoes. Haymitch drinks water from a poisonous stream but saves himself with charcoal tablets. Thus, he deduces that he should not trust any food except that supplied by the Capitol. Wyatt is killed on the first day while protecting Lou Lou, who briefly finds her way to Haymitch but is killed by inhaling toxic pollen. Haymitch reunites with Ampert after Lou Lou's death and enters an access channel designed to release genetically mutated creatures ("mutts"). Haymitch triggers the explosives while Ampert guards the exit; this floods the arena's subterranean channels. However, despite briefly promising technical malfunctions, the flood fails to disable the arena's computer systems. Haymitch returns to the arena's surface to find a pack of carnivorous squirrel mutts swarming Ampert and devouring him until only his skeleton remains. Later, when he's ambushed by a group of Careers, Maysilee saves Haymitch with a poisonous blow dart gun, renewing their partnership.

Determined to find another way to destroy the arena, Haymitch convinces Maysilee to explore its perimeter. During another fight with Careers, the tributes surprise a trio of young Gamemakers performing maintenance. Maysilee and a District 4 Career, Maritte, kill them before fleeing. Haymitch and Maysilee find a power generator at the arena's edge, and Haymitch discovers the generator's protective force field which repels objects thrown at it. After Haymitch tries to save her life by spurning her company, Maysilee is killed by waterbird mutts which Haymitch realizes were sent to punish her for killing the Gamemakers. With three tributes remaining, Haymitch seeks out the last remaining Newcomer, Wellie. He finds her up a tree, clearly starved and weighing less than 60 pounds. Haymitch receives a sponsor gift of chocolate and pudding, most of which he feeds to Wellie. He awakens in the middle of the night to the sound of Silka crying at the base of the tree and drops a chocolate to her. In the morning, after leaving to search for firewood despite Wellie's pleas to stay by her side, Haymitch returns to find Wellie decapitated by Silka. The Career tribute pursues him to the arena's edge during a brutal axe fight, throws her axe at him, and is killed when it rebounds off the force field. Mortally wounded, Haymitch detonates the final explosive against the force field in a last-ditch attempt to destroy the arena, but realizes it remains intact even as he loses consciousness, believing himself dying.

After recuperating in isolation in the Capitol, Haymitch is forced to attend public events. He realizes the televised Games have been heavily edited, erasing signs of rebellion and making him look selfish. President Snow privately tells Haymitch to enjoy his homecoming. Upon returning to District 12, Haymitch discovers his home burned and his mother and brother murdered by the fire. Later, his reunion with Lenore Dove in a quiet meadow turns tragic when Haymitch unknowingly feeds her a poisoned gumdrop, an act orchestrated by President Snow. Lenore Dove dies in his arms, imploring him to prevent another "sunrise on the reaping." Haunted by his losses, Haymitch retreats into isolation and alcoholism in the Victors' Village, distancing himself from former friends, including Burdock Everdeen. However, during the Victory Tour, Plutarch's encouragement spurs him to keep fighting.

In the epilogue, set after the original series, Haymitch tells Katniss and Peeta about his past, finding peace in caring for goose eggs gifted by Katniss in memory of Lenore Dove.

== Characters ==
=== Tributes ===
- Haymitch Abernathy – A male tribute from District 12. He is outspoken, short-tempered, and trying his best to return to his family and girlfriend in District 12.
- Maysilee Donner – A female tribute from District 12. She is the original owner of the Mockingjay pin given to Katniss in The Hunger Games. She has a twin sister, Merrilee Donner. Killed by waterbird mutts keyed to attack only her.
- Wyatt Callow – A male tribute from District 12. He is an oddsmaker with a family history of gambling on the tributes. Killed defending Lou Lou in the initial bloodbath.
- Louella McCoy – A female tribute from District 12. Killed in an accident during the Tribute Parade and replaced with a body double, Lou Lou, by the Capitol.
- Lou Lou – A girl from District 11 who is abducted and drugged by the Capitol to replace Louella.
- Ampert – a male tribute from District 3. He is Beetee's son and part of the Newcomers alliance. Killed and devoured by weasel mutts keyed to attack only him.
- Wellie – A female tribute from District 6. She is part of the Newcomers Alliance. Killed and beheaded by Silka.
- Silka Sharp – A female tribute from District 1 who was part of the Career pack. Killed by her own axe rebounding off the forcefield whilst fighting Haymitch.
- Panache Barker – A male tribute from District 1 who was part of the Career pack. Killed by one of Maysilee's poisonous darts.
- Woodbine Chance – A male tribute from District 12. He attempts to escape the Reaping when his name is drawn and is shot by a Peacekeeper sniper. Haymitch is chosen to replace him.

=== Capitol Residents ===
- Plutarch Heavensbee – Capitol cameraman assigned to District 12 tributes.
- Drusilla Sickle – Capitol escort for the District 12 tributes and Magno's estranged wife.
- Coriolanus Snow – President of Panem.
- Effie Trinket – Emergency escort and stylist for the District 12 tributes.
- Proserpina Trinket and Vitus – Prep team for Haymitch during the Second Quarter Quell.
- Caesar Flickerman – Host of the interviews for the Hunger Games.
- Magno Stift – Stylist for the District 12 tributes and Drusilla's estranged husband.

=== Mentors ===
- Mags – Victor of the 11th Hunger Games. Mentor for the District 12 tributes during the Second Quarter Quell.
- Wiress – Victor of the 49th Hunger Games. Mentor for the District 12 tributes during the Second Quarter Quell.
- Beetee – Victor of the 34th Hunger Games. Mentor for the District 3 tributes during the Second Quarter Quell.

=== District 12 Residents ===
- Lenore Dove Baird – Haymitch's girlfriend. A member of the Covey.
- Sid Abernathy – Haymitch's ten-year-old brother.
- Willamae Abernathy – Haymitch's mother.
- Burdock Everdeen – Haymitch's best friend and eventual father of Katniss and Prim. He is Lenore Dove's distant cousin.
- Asterid March – Burdock's girlfriend and eventual mother of Katniss and Prim.

== Release ==
On October 16, 2024, the book's cover and synopsis were revealed on NBC's The Today Show. On January 15, 2025, an excerpt from Chapter 1 was released in an article in People magazine. It revealed details such as the names of Haymitch's brother, Sid Abernathy, and girlfriend, Lenore Dove Baird, and that his birthday is reaping day. On March 13, 2025, a clip of Suzanne Collins reading from Sunrise on the Reaping was posted on Scholastic's YouTube page. The scene featured focused on the character of Haymitch's girlfriend, Lenore Dove.

Sunrise on the Reaping had a hardcover release date of March 18, 2025. The audiobook had the same release date. It is narrated by actor Jefferson White.

Sunrise on the Reaping sold over 1.5 million copies worldwide in its first week, marking the biggest debut for any title in Suzanne Collins' The Hunger Games series. In the U.S. alone, the book sold 1.2 million copies, more than twice the opening sales of The Ballad of Songbirds and Snakes and over three times that of Mockingjay. By July 2025, Publishers Weekly reported that it had sold almost 1.7 million copies, making it the second-highest selling book of the year. By January 2026, it had sold 4.4 million English World copies, with 3.3 million in the U.S. alone.

== Critical reception ==
Upon release, Sunrise on the Reaping received highly positive reviews. Dhanika Pineda of NPR gave it a positive review, writing that the social and political issues portrayed in it were relevant to the ones facing modern society. Julie Huang of The California Aggie wrote "Sunrise begins to recontextualize everything that was seemingly well-established in the original series and never once misses an opportunity to make readers question everything they thought they knew." Blog OneReadingNurse.com gave it 5/5 stars, praising the characters and brutality of the games.

Helen Burke of The Daily Collegian criticized the use of songs and poems but praised "the emotional depth of Haymitch’s relationships and the underlying themes of survival, loss and rebellion." Kirkus Reviews gave it a starred review, writing "Collins combines many of the best qualities of the series into one book, balancing layers of personal insights, worldbuilding, and danger to form an inescapable whirlwind of suspense and conflict." Annika Good of The Uproar called it "an emotional rollercoaster...[that] deepens readers’ understanding of Haymitch and expands the world Collins created in unexpected and provocative ways." Lizz Schumer of People wrote "Collins is awfully good at what she does — the sharp descriptions, the heart-pounding battles, the creative punishments and machinations in the Arena...It’s a life-giving book...Because it reminds us that unity is worth something. In some cases, it’s worth everything."

Hannah E. Gadway of The Harvard Crimson praised the pacing but wrote "its biggest flaw lies in its relationship to the other novels in the series...Sunrise on the Reaping does not exist in a vacuum and fails to cover new thematic ground, leaving it reliant on the other novels in the series." Kaylee Nguyen of The Johns Hopkins News-Letter criticized it for being "safer, more predictable and ultimately less thought-provoking" than previous installments. Frank Remski of The Eastern Echo scored it an 8.5/10, praising the flow and darkness but feeling it did not bring anything new in terms of worldbuilding.

== Film adaptation ==
The film adaptation was directed by Francis Lawrence and written by Billy Ray. It began filming in July 2025 and released on November 20, 2026. Joseph Zada was cast as Haymitch, Mckenna Grace as Maysilee Donner, Ralph Fiennes as President Snow, and Whitney Peak as Lenore Dove, Ben Wang as Wyatt Callow, Jesse Plemons as Plutarch Heavensbee, Elle Fanning as Effie Trinket, Glenn Close as Drusilla, Kieran Culkin as Caesar Flickerman, and Scott Greenan as Burdock.
