= Coriolanus Snow =

Fictional character from The Hunger Games

- The Hunger Games character
- Eighteen-year-old Snow is portrayed by Tom Blyth (left); President Snow is portrayed by Donald Sutherland (right)
- First appearance: The Hunger Games (2008 novel)
- Last appearance: Sunrise on the Reaping (2025 novel)
- Created by: Suzanne Collins
- Portrayed by: Donald Sutherland (main films); Tom Blyth (The Ballad of Songbirds and Snakes); Dexter Sol Ansell (young, The Ballad of Songbirds and Snakes); Ralph Fiennes (Sunrise on the Reaping); John Malkovich (play)

In-universe information
- Full name: Coriolanus Snow
- Nickname: Coryo
- Titles: President Snow; Private Snow
- Occupation: President of Panem; Peacekeeper
- Family: Crassus Snow (father); Grandma'am (paternal grandmother); Tigris Snow (paternal cousin)
- Spouses: Lucy Gray Baird (ex-girlfriend); Unnamed wife (possibly Livia Cardew)
- Home: Capitol, Panem
- Nationality: Panemian

Coriolanus "Coryo" Snow is a character in The Hunger Games franchise, a book series and film series. In the original book trilogy (2008–2010), President Snow is the dictator of the state of Panem through the end of the Second Rebellion, which deposes him. In the prequel book, The Ballad of Songbirds and Snakes (2020), he is an ambitious, intelligent and charismatic 18-year-old. He is assigned the role of mentoring a girl competing in the tenth Hunger Games—singer Lucy Gray Baird—and forms a relationship with her.

In the first four film adaptations, President Snow is portrayed by Donald Sutherland. He asked to be involved in the series as he believed it would engage young viewers in the politics of revolution. Tom Blyth was cast as the younger Snow in the film The Ballad of Songbirds & Snakes (2023): he saw the character as progressing through three stages, from naive and ambitious to the more reserved, Sutherland-like character.

Roses are a symbol of the Snow family, connecting Coriolanus to his mother and grandmother. He uses roses to communicate with The Hunger Games' main character, Katniss Everdeen. His signature method of eliminating his enemies is with poison. Snow is influenced by Dr. Gaul's view of state control as a necessity to prevent disorder. He initially acts to help Lucy Gray out of self-interest but develops feelings for her. Lucy Gray bears similarities to Katniss, including their musicality, home, and experience in the Hunger Games.

Critics of both the book and film disapproved of the choice to center Snow in The Ballad of Songbirds and Snakes, as it is known that he will become a villain. However, Sutherland's performance in four The Hunger Games films—which expanded the role of President Snow from the books—garnered acclaim. Sutherland was nominated for a Teen Choice Award and an MTV Movie Award.

== Character history ==
Snow lives in Panem, the dystopian North America, where an elite Capitol rules over 12 Districts. Each year, a Hunger Games takes place to punish the Districts for a failed revolution, known as the Dark Days. The Games consist of a male and female child from each District, known as Tributes, fighting to the death until one remains.

=== The Ballad of Songbirds and Snakes ===
Snow comes from a wealthy Capitol family that lost its status in the Dark Days, where his father Crassus Snow was killed in battle and his fortune - invested in ammunition district 13, which is destroyed in the revolution - is lost. Snow faces eviction from his penthouse apartment, along with his cousin Tigris and grandmother—who they refer to as Grandma'am. The family has sold much of their belongings and struggles to eat well.

In the tenth Hunger Games, 18-year-old Snow has an opportunity as a mentor to boost his status and fund his upcoming university studies to save himself, Tigris and Grandma’am. He is assigned the female Tribute of District 12, 16-year-old Lucy Gray Baird, who shows character and performance through her singing. Snow meets her at the train station, sneaks her food and prepares her to win Capitol sponsorships so he can provide her with food and water in the arena—a new feature of the Games that he suggests. They grow close and hold hands with each other.

Dr. Gaul, the Gamemaker, is interested in Snow's views on the Games and suggestions on how to increase their appeal. She forces him to enter the arena to remove another mentor—District-born Sejanus Plinth—who is protesting against the Games. While leaving with Sejanus, Snow kills a Tribute to defend himself. Snow realizes Dr. Gaul plans to let mutated snakes loose in the arena and drops a handkerchief with Lucy Gray's scent into the snakes' cage so that they do not attack her. Lucy Gray wins the Games because of this.

Dean Highbottom discovers Snow has cheated and coerces him to sign up to be a Peacekeeper, where he will enforce order in District 12. Sejanus also signs up as a Peacekeeper. Snow reunites with Lucy Gray, and they start a relationship; he attends her musical performances with her family, the Covey. He is jealous of her past with a boy, Billy Taupe, but she writes songs about Snow. After becoming caught up in a rebel plot that involves Sejanus, Snow kills a citizen with an illicit gun and provides information that leads Sejanus and a rebel to be executed. Fearing he will be executed next, he runs away in the woods with Lucy Gray.

Snow discovers and destroys the last evidence of his crimes as Lucy Gray begins to distrust him over the number of people he says he has killed. He pursues her through the woods, and she leaves a snake to attack him. He shoots at her and is unsure whether she has died or escaped. He returns to the Capitol, where he is assigned a prestigious mentorship under Dr. Gaul.

=== The Hunger Games trilogy ===
In The Hunger Games, Catching Fire and Mockingjay, Coriolanus Snow is the president of Panem. In Catching Fire, Snow meets with Katniss Everdeen before her Victory Tour to threaten her and her loved ones. To crush anti-Capitol sentiment, Snow says Katniss must convince even him that her relationship with Peeta is real. In Mockingjay, Snow directs the Capitol's military campaign to quash the revolution in the Districts and becomes Katniss' archenemy.

In the book Mockingjay, Snow is seen on television and in Katniss' imagination. Katniss demands to be the one to kill Snow in order to join the rebels' propaganda team, a moment removed from the films. She later insists on fighting in the Capitol in order to kill Snow directly. After the rebel victory, Katniss finds Snow nonetheless upbeat as he talks about the pair of them being "played for fools". Snow begins to make Katniss believe that District 13 dropped the bombs that killed her younger sister Prim. A public execution for Snow is held, where Katniss is to kill him with a bow and arrow. Instead, she shoots rebellion leader Alma Coin, leading Snow to laugh uncontrollably and die from coughing up blood or crushed by the frenzied crowd.

In the film adaptations, Snow has a larger role, with additional scenes shown from his point of view. In the first film, he has conversations with Head Gamemaker Seneca Crane in a rose garden. In Catching Fire, his main role is to discuss with Head Gamemaker Plutarch Heavensbee. In Mockingjay – Part 1, a team behind him including a speech writer are introduced. In Mockingjay – Part 2, he poisons a general at a formal dinner.

A deleted scene from Mockingjay – Part 1 shows Snow discussing the uprisings with Peeta and explaining Peeta's role in his propaganda campaign. It was omitted as the film is shown from Katniss' perspective.

== Characterization ==
Snow takes his forename from the Roman general Gnaeus Marcius Coriolanus. In William Shakespeare's play Coriolanus, the general supports aristocrats' elevated political power in society. Sarah Lyall of The New York Times compared his villainous role to Machiavelli, Nero and Richard III. His villainy as president is more overt in the films, where he resembles a James Bond villain, than in the books.

The Ballad of Songbirds and Snakes depicts how Snow became a villain. Author Suzanne Collins thought of the William Wordsworth quote, "the child is the father of the man", when reflecting on how Snow's childhood influenced his views towards food, women and Panem. She considered the idea of tabula rasa—that people are born as 'blank slates' and develop through life experiences—but noted that Snow's contemporaries have contrasting personalities despite suffering in wartime. Michael Lesslie, who co-wrote the film adaptation, considered that Snow had justifications for all of his acts, even in a moral level given most were selfish, and by the end of his journey, with the person he trusted and loved betraying him, Snow came to see Lucy Gray as representative of "the kind of violent chaos of all of the districts and all of humanity", which he would eventually try to control and silence through authoritarianism.

Eighteen-year-old Snow is presented as a charismatic and talented student. Snow is egotistical, ambitious and controlling: though his actions appear morally virtuous, his rationale is selfish or opportunistic. He believes himself a good person, despite his impossible situation, and better by birthright than his District-born classmate Sejanus.

By the time of The Hunger Games, Snow represents the state of Panem. He is a fascist and a totalitarian dictator who aims to crush the revolution. As president, Snow shows ruthlessness, intelligence and sadism.

Roses symbolize the Snow legacy. Coriolanus Snow owns a compact from his mother with rose-scented powder that reminds him of her. On their penthouse's roof, Grandma'am cultivates a rose garden. She values the roses highly and gives Snow several for important occasions. When he is president, Snow gives Katniss a rose after their meeting in Catching Fire and leaves a single rose in her bombed house in Mockingjay. Roses are dropped after the bombing of District 13.

According to Finnick in Mockingjay, Snow poisoned his enemies to ascend to the presidency, drinking from the same cups as them to gain trust and then taking an antidote. Drinking poison gave him mouth sores and he masked the smell of blood with roses. Snow is seen to poison Dean Highbottom in The Ballad of Songbirds & Snakes. Snow's father was responsible for the Hunger Games' founding, submitting a drunken idea of Highbottom's as part of an assignment when both were students. Highbottom bears a grudge against Coriolanus Snow as a consequence.

=== Relationship to other characters ===
Snow initially acts on Lucy Gray's behalf as a path to reaching university. However, he soon begins to genuinely care for her and struggles to distinguish between his motives for helping her. Snow experiences both love and possessiveness towards Lucy Gray. In his view, however, Lucy Gray betrays him, and he becomes a colder character.

Katniss may remind Snow of Lucy Gray due to their shared district, musical talent and relationship formed in the Games. Snow believes that Peeta loves Katniss, but that she does not reciprocate; he forces her on the Victory Tour to "convince him" that the relationship is real. Katniss sings as revolutionary propaganda, which parallels Lucy Gray's songwriting. She also directly sings songs composed by Lucy Gray. Collins said Lucy Gray's music "helped to bring down" President Snow, citing Katniss singing "Deep in the Meadow" to Rue during a Hunger Games.

Snow is sympathetic in his initial disgust towards Dr. Gaul. However, they share the view that the Games are necessary to show humans' behavior at its most animalistic. Dr. Gaul encourages Snow to see the Capitol's control of Panem as justified to protect against chaos.

== Casting ==
=== Donald Sutherland ===
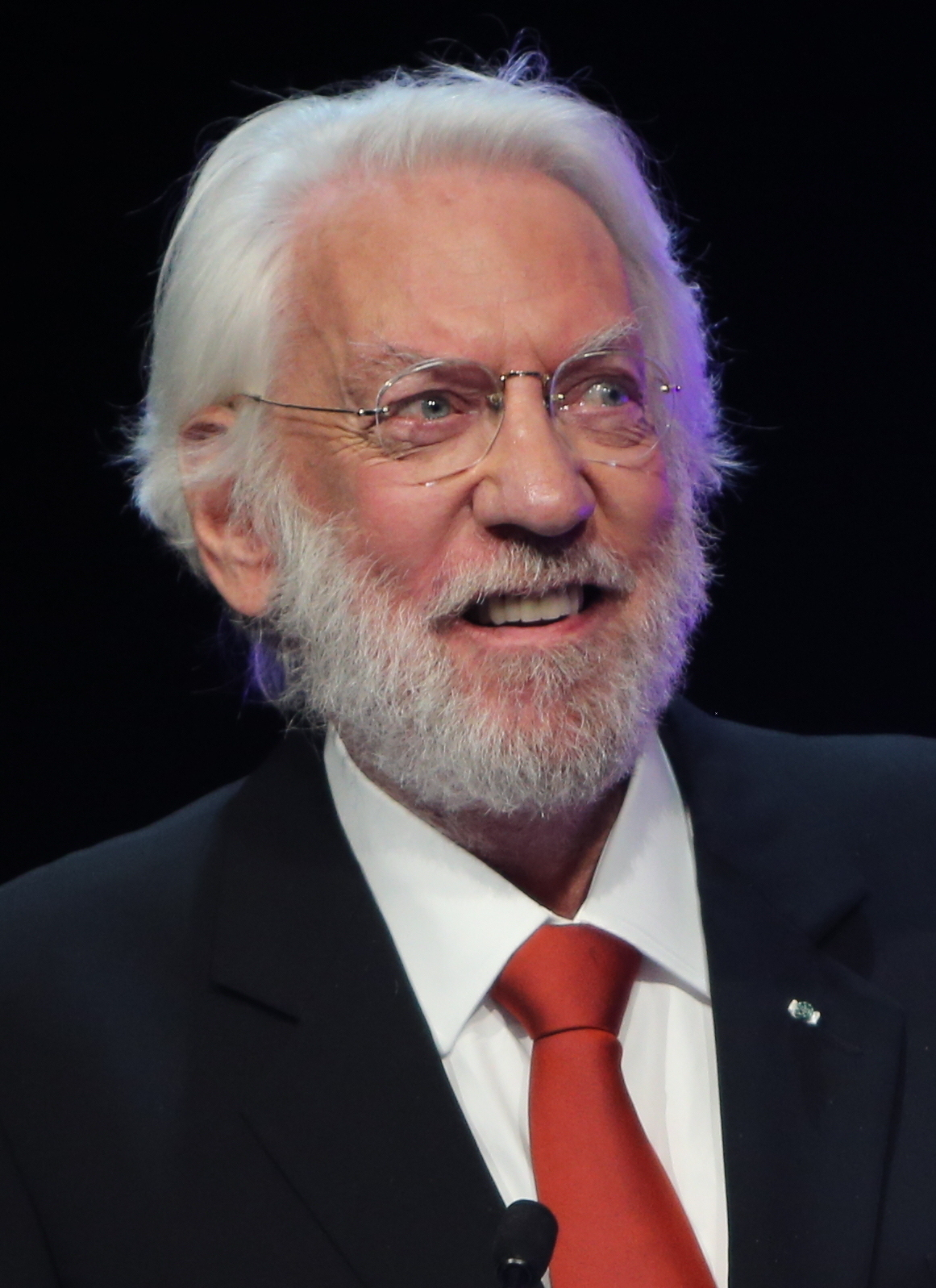
Donald Sutherland portrayed Snow in the four Hunger Games films.

Donald Sutherland portrayed the elderly Snow in four Hunger Games films. He read the first film's script and asked to be part of it because of its political themes. Sutherland, who had engaged in left-wing activism, wanted young viewers to organize and start a revolutionary movement to create political change in the United States. Snow had few lines in the script, but director Gary Ross added scenes for the character in a rose garden.

Sutherland saw inequality, power and hope as the themes of the series and believed Snow was irredeemable. Sutherland compared Snow to several U.S. presidents for their "expedient decisions" to exert control. Sutherland said Snow respects Katniss, who challenges him and shows him how his life could have gone; conversely, Sutherland believed Katniss would have become president of Panem if she were Snow's granddaughter.

=== Tom Blyth ===
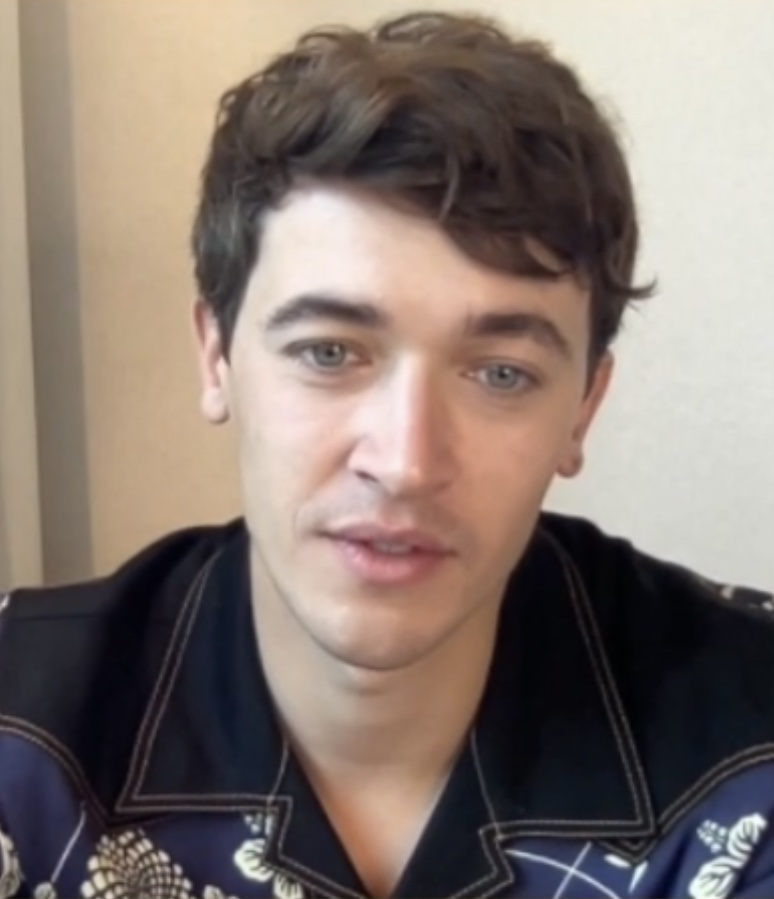
Tom Blyth portrayed Snow in The Ballad of Songbirds & Snakes.

Tom Blyth was cast as the younger Snow in The Ballad of Songbirds & Snakes. Director Francis Lawrence wanted to cast somebody with blue eyes, to match Sutherland. Over a two-month period, Blyth underwent rounds of solo auditioning and script reading with people auditioning as Lucy Gray, to test the actors' chemistry. Producer Nina Jacobson said the difficulty was finding an actor who could portray Snow's heroic side as well as his villainous side. As Snow is underfed, Blyth said he dieted mostly on "apple slices and almond butter" for six months. Blyth's hair was dyed from brown to blond.

Neither Lawrence nor Blyth wanted to recreate Sutherland's characterization of Snow. However, Blyth's voice changed towards the end of the film to be more similar to Sutherland's Snow. The film ends with a voice-over line by Sutherland, which he says in Mockingjay – Part 1: "It's the things we love most that destroy us". Snow tells Katniss this as the rebels rescue Peeta, who has been tortured into despising Katniss. This line was included by the Lionsgate marketing team in a trailer and then incorporated into the film by Lawrence.

Blyth hoped viewers could understand Snow's motivations and how he became evil through the movie. Blyth saw his character as undergoing three stages: naive and ambitious ("Coryo"); entering manhood ("Coriolanus"); and the guarded figure played by Sutherland ("future President Snow"). Jacobson said the film required the audience to side with Snow despite knowing his fate, but also needed to portray his greed and ambition.

== Reception ==
=== The Ballad of Songbirds and Snakes book ===
Lucy Pavia of The Evening Standard found that Snow "fails to stir much empathy or interest" with his "oddly curdled" mixture of empathy and ambition. Pavia was unclear which character the audience was supposed to support, contrasting him with Katniss. Time's Megan McCluskey criticized that his character was "reverse-engineered" based on his role in The Hunger Games, with the "roots of his at-any-costs ambition" not justified.

In contrast, Laura Miller of Slate praised Snow as a more relatable and realistic protagonist than Katniss, as he experiences "petty resentments, flashes of generosity, and moral failures". Miller found his perspective tiring in the middle of the book but praised the book's direction as Coriolanus is forced to make difficult choices in District 12.

=== The Ballad of Songbirds & Snakes film ===
Many critics disapproved of the film's focus on Snow. Vulture's Roxana Hadadi reviewed that Snow's future villainy and a single year of his life prevent the movie from forming "a coherent portrait" of the character. In HuffPost, Candice Frederick objected to the origin story of a white male villain as clichéd. Frederick found it hard to be invested in the story when Snow's villainy is already known and criticized the implications of an oppressed woman of color—Lucy Gray—falling in love with her white oppressor—Snow. Lauren Coates of Chicago Reader said the film did not "fully commit to exploring Snow as a twisted antihero", instead focusing on the "distraction" of Snow and Lucy Gray's Romeo and Juliet-like relationship.

Sandra Hall of The Sydney Morning Herald described Blyth's Snow as "intimidatingly tall with icy blue eyes, blonde curls and a patrician demeanour". In Deadline Hollywood, Valerie Complex said Snow had "uncharacteristic hesitancy and lack of confidence", unlike the book's "chillingly dispassionate cunning", and that humanizing the character worked against the film. The Observer's Wendy Ide found Snow "oddly inconsistent" and undeveloped; Time's Stephanie Zacharek questioned why Lucy Gray would be attracted to him. In contrast, Riley Utley of Cinema Blend argued that neither truly loved the other and that their relationship was transactional in nature, believing that Lucy loved him as a result of traumatizing circumstances and Snow love's for her was an accidental result of using her for power, which he valued more. Elizabeth Weitzman of Time Out praised Blyth's "understated charisma" and chemistry with other actors for providing the "steady centre" of the film.

=== The Hunger Games films ===
Sutherland was nominated for a 2014 MTV Movie Award in the Best Villain category for Catching Fire. He was nominated for a 2015 Teen Choice Award in the Movie Villain category for Mockingjay – Part 1.

Critics largely praised Sutherland's acting. Reviewers noted that his white beard makes him resemble a lion. The Independent reviewer Geoffrey Macnab called him a "sleekly evil, beard-stroking President". The New Yorker's David Denby found his "satanic eyebrows and rounded, insinuating voice" entertaining. Emily St. James, writing in Vox, lauded Sutherland as "icily brilliant". Nonetheless, David Thomson of The New Republic criticized Sutherland as "hollow and predictable" in the role of a "portentous mastermind".

His role in the films' narrative was met with mixed reception. Writing in The Globe and Mail, Geoff Pevere believed his role increased the dramatic tension of Catching Fire. Hall criticized Snow's diminished screen time in Mockingjay – Part 1 compared to previous films. IGN's Terri Schwartz said that Mockingjay – Part 2 neglects other characters to focus on the rivalry between Katniss and Snow, adding that Katniss' refusal to kill Snow at the end "lacks the punch it needs".

Collider wrote that his role deserves to be put alongside the best villains in 21st-century cinema.
