= The Hunger Games: The Ballad of Songbirds & Snakes =

2023 film by Francis Lawrence

- Theatrical release poster
- Directed by: Francis Lawrence
- Screenplay by: Michael Lesslie; Michael Arndt
- Based on: The Ballad of Songbirds and Snakes by Suzanne Collins
- Produced by: Nina Jacobson; Brad Simpson; Francis Lawrence
- Starring: Tom Blyth; Rachel Zegler; Hunter Schafer; Jason Schwartzman; Peter Dinklage; Josh Andrés Rivera; Viola Davis
- Cinematography: Jo Willems
- Edited by: Mark Yoshikawa
- Music by: James Newton Howard
- Production companies: Lionsgate; Good Universe; Color Force
- Distributed by: Lionsgate
- Release dates: November 5, 2023 (Zoo Palast); November 17, 2023 (United States)
- Running time: 157 minutes
- Country: United States
- Language: English
- Budget: $100 million
- Box office: $361.8 million

The Hunger Games: The Ballad of Songbirds & Snakes is a 2023 American dystopian film produced and directed by Francis Lawrence from a screenplay by Michael Lesslie and Michael Arndt, based on the 2020 novel The Ballad of Songbirds and Snakes by Suzanne Collins. It serves as a prequel to The Hunger Games (2012) and the fifth installment in The Hunger Games film series. The film stars Tom Blyth, Rachel Zegler, Hunter Schafer, Jason Schwartzman, Peter Dinklage, Josh Andrés Rivera and Viola Davis. In the film, Coriolanus Snow (Blyth) is called on to mentor Lucy Gray Baird (Zegler), a Games tribute, as he seeks to restore his family's prosperity in Panem.

Lionsgate CEO Jon Feltheimer confirmed future The Hunger Games films would be produced if Collins wrote further installments. In 2019, an adaptation of The Ballad of Songbirds & Snakes was jointly announced with the novel and official development on the film began a year later, with Lawrence returning as director and Lesslie and Arndt serving as screenwriters. Blyth and Zegler were cast in May 2022 and principal photography began that July and lasted until that November, with filming locations including Wrocław, Berlin and Leipzig.

The Hunger Games: The Ballad of Songbirds & Snakes premiered at the Zoo Palast in Berlin on November 5, 2023, and was released in the United States on November 17. The film grossed $361 million worldwide against a production budget of $100 million. It received mixed reviews from critics. A sequel, Sunrise on the Reaping, released on November 20, 2026.

== Plot ==
In a war-ravaged Panem, 18-year-old Capitol resident Coriolanus Snow is selected to be among 24 mentors for tributes in the 10th Annual Hunger Games, overseen by Dean Casca Highbottom, who was a friend of Coriolanus's late father and one of the originators of the Games. The winning tribute's mentor is to be awarded the Plinth Prize scholarship, which Snow hopes to use to restore his family's former prosperity. The final winner of the scholarship will be determined by Head Gamemaker Dr. Volumnia Gaul, based not just on the outcome of the game, but her judgement of the mentor's behavior.

Coriolanus accepts the Games but his wealthy friend Sejanus Plinth from District 2 finds them morally repugnant. Sejanus is assigned Marcus from District 2 as his tribute while Coriolanus is assigned Lucy Gray Baird from District 12, who makes an impression when she sings to the crowd during the televised reaping ceremony. Coriolanus earns Lucy Gray's trust while accompanying her to the Capitol Zoo, where tributes are publicly caged. Fellow mentor Arachne Crane is killed by her tribute Brandy after repeatedly taunting her with food. Snow tries in vain to save her while Brandy is shot. Dr. Gaul injures and possibly kills one of Coriolanus's classmates, Clemensia Dovecote, with a genetically engineered snake for lying about a note that was actually written by Coriolanus.

The day before the Games commence, Lucy Gray and Coriolanus tour the game arena. Rebel bombs explode, killing several tributes and mentors, including the President's son, Felix. Lucy Gray saves Coriolanus from falling debris. That night, he gives Lucy Gray rat poison and points out several tunnels that have opened from the explosions. Following the attack, Marcus attempts to escape the games. He is captured by Peacekeepers and strung up in the arena, enraging his friend and mentor, Sejanus Plinth. The Games commence the next morning, with Lucy Gray surviving the initial bloodbath and reuniting with Jessup, District 12's male tribute, who is sick from an animal bite. During the games, Sejanus bribes a Peacekeeper and sneaks into the arena to ceremoniously sprinkle breadcrumbs on Marcus's body. Disturbed by this defiance, Head Gamemaker Dr. Gaul recruits Coriolanus to bring back Sejanus. The two are attacked by a tribute whom Coriolanus kills before escaping the arena.

Jessup, who has contracted rabies, attacks Lucy Gray, but Coriolanus convinces his mentor to send him water, causing Jessup to fall to his death. Later Lucy Gray accidentally kills District 11's gentle tribute Dill by adding rat poison to the water she consumes, although it was intended for a dangerous tribute. Dill's partner, Reaper, lays out the tribute's corpses in the center of the arena, and covers them with a Panem flag in a gesture of defiance. Sadistic Dr. Gaul interrupts the broadcast to announce that a swarm of genetically engineered snakes will be unleashed to annihilate the tributes in revenge for Felix's death. Coriolanus slips a handkerchief with Lucy Gray's scent into the tank of snakes, ensuring that they will not attack her. With all other tributes dead, Lucy Gray emerges as the victor of the games.

Afterwards, Dean Casca Highbottom accuses Coriolanus of cheating, having found the handkerchief and recognized the compact filled with poison that Lucy Gray used. Highbottom sentences Coriolanus to becoming a Peacekeeper, and Coriolanus bribes an officer to transfer him to District 12. Sejanus, who is disgusted with the Capitol's cruelty, joins him. In District 12, Coriolanus and Lucy Gray reunite; their mutual attraction is complicated by their divided loyalties. Coriolanus tries to maintain as much neutrality toward the local population as he can, but his role as Peacekeeper makes that impossible. Sejanus is radicalized by the Peacekeeper's violence and joins the rebels. Coriolanus secretly records Sejanus's plans to support the rebels in an attack. He later confronts Sejanus, Spruce, Billy Taupe and Mayfair. In the ensuing confrontation, Coriolanus fatally shoots Mayfair, and Spruce kills Billy Taupe. Spruce hides the guns, but he and Sejanus are hanged for treason after Coriolanus's report reaches the Capitol.

Lucy Gray and Coriolanus flee into the woods with the intent to leave Panem. At a small cabin, Coriolanus finds the hidden weapons tying him to Mayfair's murder. Lucy Gray, having seemingly become distrustful of Coriolanus and suspecting his involvement in Sejanus's death, disappears into the woods. Coriolanus searches for Lucy Gray, but is bitten by a snake that was hidden under his mother's scarf that he gave her. Paranoid and enraged, Coriolanus shoots at Lucy Gray, but she escapes. Subsequently, Coriolanus disposes of the guns into the lake near the cabin, and then, with no remaining witnesses, he returns to his barracks. He learns that he is being transferred back to the Capital, with no one aware that he betrayed Sejanus.

Coriolanus is summoned by Dr. Gaul, who has procured his pardon as well as the Plinth Prize scholarship to the Capitol University. She is pleased that he has abandoned his principles and is willing to betray anyone to gain power. Sejanus's wealthy parents, unaware Coriolanus caused their son's death, make him their heir. Dean Highbottom tells Coriolanus that Lucy Gray's fate is unknown. Highbottom confesses that he conceived of the Hunger Games while he was drunk, but Coriolanus' father made them real, and Highbottom has been tormented by it ever since, becoming a morphine addict. Coriolanus poisons Highbottom's drug stash, killing him and beginning his rise to power.

== Cast ==
- Tom Blyth as Coriolanus "Coryo" Snow, a mentor for the upcoming 10th Hunger Games and future president of Panem
  - Dexter Sol Ansell as young Coriolanus
  - Archival audio of Donald Sutherland as the older President Coriolanus, from The Hunger Games: Mockingjay – Part 1, is played at the end of the film. This was Sutherland's final appearance in the role prior to his death in June 2024.
- Rachel Zegler as Lucy Gray Baird, the female tribute from District 12 and a member of the Covey, a traveling musician group
- Hunter Schafer as Tigris Snow, Coriolanus's older cousin and confidante. She would go on to become a stylist in the Games and an ally to Katniss Everdeen in The Hunger Games: Mockingjay – Part 2, played in that film by Eugenie Bondurant.
  - Rosa Gotzler as young Tigris
- Jason Schwartzman as Lucretius "Lucky" Flickerman, the host of the Hunger Games
- Peter Dinklage as Casca Highbottom, the dean of the Academy
- Josh Andrés Rivera as Sejanus Plinth, Coriolanus' best friend, fellow mentor and heir to the huge Plinth family fortune.
- Viola Davis as Dr. Volumnia Gaul, Head Gamemaker of the Hunger Games
- Fionnula Flanagan as Grandma'am, Coriolanus and Tigris's grandmother
- Burn Gorman as Commander Hoff, head Peacekeeper in District 12

=== Additional mentors ===
- Ashley Liao as Clemensia Dovecote, a classmate and friend of Coriolanus, and a mentor to a tribute from District 11
- Max Raphael as Festus Creed, a classmate of Coriolanus, and mentor to a tribute from District 4
- Zoe Renee as Lysistrata Vickers, a classmate of Coriolanus, and mentor of the other District 12 tribute, Jessup
- Aamer Husain as Felix Ravinstill, a classmate of Coriolanus, son of the president of Panem, and mentor to a tribute from District 11
- Lilly Cooper as Arachne Crane, a classmate of Coriolanus and a mentor to a tribute from District 10

=== Additional tributes ===
- Nick Benson as Jessup, the male tribute from District 12 alongside Lucy Gray
- Mackenzie Lansing as Coral, the female tribute from District 4 and leader of "the Pack". Coral's role from the books was expanded to fit the film's plot.
- Cooper Dillon as Mizzen, the male tribute from District 4
- Kjell Brutscheidt as Tanner, the male tribute from District 10
- Sofia Sanchez as Wovey, the young female tribute from District 8

Dakota Shapiro plays Billy Taupe Clade, Lucy Gray's former love interest and a former member of the Covey. Isobel Jesper Jones plays Mayfair Lipp, the daughter of District 12's mayor, a rival of Lucy Gray, and Billy Taupe's new girlfriend. George Somner plays Spruce, a rebel citizen from District 12. Other members of Lucy Gray's travelling musician group, the Covey, include Vaughan Reilly as Maude Ivory, Honor Gillies as Barb Azure, Eike Onyambu as Tam Amber, and Konstantin Taffet as Clerk Carmine Clade. Michael Greco and Daniela Grubert appear as Strabo Plinth and Mrs. Plinth, Sejanus' parents, while Carl Spencer and Scott Folan appear as Smiley and Beanpole, two peacekeepers sent by the Capitol to District 12.

== Production ==
=== Development ===
In February 2015, nine months before the release of The Hunger Games: Mockingjay - Part 2, Lionsgate CEO Jon Feltheimer revealed that they were "actively looking at some development and thinking about prequel and developments possibilities" for The Hunger Games film series, similar to what Warner Bros. was doing with the Harry Potter franchise, re-launching with the then-upcoming Fantastic Beasts films. The studio reiterated the decision in December 2015. That same month, Jennifer Lawrence, who played Katniss Everdeen in the films, when asked about the idea of spin-offs, she stated, "I think it's too soon. They've got to let the body get cold, in my opinion." She also revealed she would not be involved in the spin-offs. In August 2017, Lionsgate CEO Jon Feltheimer expressed interest in more stories in the franchise, but only with the approval of the series' author, Suzanne Collins.

In June 2019, Joe Drake, chairman of the Lionsgate Motion Picture Group, announced that the company was working with author Collins with regards to an adaptation of the jointly announced novel The Ballad of Songbirds and Snakes. By April 2020, Collins and Lionsgate confirmed that plans were underway for the film's development, with Francis Lawrence confirmed to direct, after doing so for the prior three films in the series since The Hunger Games: Catching Fire. The screenplay was written by Michael Arndt and Michael Lesslie, with Nina Jacobson and Brad Simpson as producers alongside Lawrence. On July 24, 2020, Lawrence confirmed that the script for the film was "progressing really well" and stated that after reading the story, he loved what it was about and how relevant it was. Concerned over the book's length, Lawrence briefly considered to split the film in two parts like he did with The Hunger Games: Mockingjay – Part 1 and The Hunger Games: Mockingjay – Part 2, but abandoned the idea to do so, due to his regrets over that decision. Jacobson felt that the finished film had a "daunting" length but feels that it "really goes by so fast". Collins, in addition, would serve as an executive producer on the film.

Lesslie said that he had many conversations with Collins while writing the script, where the author reiterated that the movie had to have the philosophical discourse of state of nature represented by the characters' personality. Collins also insisted that everything regarding Lucy Gray would be restricted to what Snow could witness, particularly to keep the mystery of her eventual fate. He noted an underlying theme was how young people came of age in this post-apocalyptic world, and particularly in a Capitol with the "filthy allure of wealth" that was comparable to The Talented Mr. Ripley and Succession, in having "that weird kind of hyperactive status drive, and status insecurity of people with privilege". Regarding Snow's journey, Lesslie realized that the story shifts with acts of violence, to the point that Snow starts "as horrified by the violence as we are" only for both the audience and Snow to be desensitized by the film's end.

=== Casting ===
In May 2022, Tom Blyth was cast as the young President Snow, with Rachel Zegler as his protégée, tribute Lucy Gray Baird. Zegler was originally offered the role in January, but initially turned it down before later changing her mind. In June 2022, Josh Andrés Rivera (who previously starred in 2021's West Side Story alongside Zegler), Hunter Schafer and Jason Schwartzman were cast. Peter Dinklage was cast in the following month. Throughout June and July 2022, the cast was rounded out with actors portraying the film's multiple tributes and mentors. On August 15, 2022, it was reported that Viola Davis was cast as Volumnia Gaul, the head gamemaker of the 10th annual Hunger Games. On September 16, 2022, more cast members were revealed, including Burn Gorman and Fionnula Flanagan.

=== Filming ===
Filming began in Wrocław, Poland, on July 11, 2022, and ended in Berlin, Germany, on November 5, 2022, under the working title Butterfly. Filming locations included the Monument to the Battle of the Nations in Leipzig, the Strausberger Platz and the Olympic Stadium in Berlin and the Centennial Hall in Wrocław. Some scenes in the film were also shot in the "Landschaftspark Duisburg-Nord" in Duisburg in North Rhine-Westphalia, and areas around Wałbrzych (Poland), including Boguszów-Gorce; a fragment of the trail leading to Chełmiec Mountain, and the lake in Grzędy.

== Music ==
The soundtrack for The Ballad of Songbirds & Snakes contains the film's version of songs such as "The Hanging Tree", "Pure as the Driven Snow", which were live performed by Zegler, and executive produced by Dave Cobb, which heavily drew from Appalachian-country folk music. The official soundtrack The Hunger Games: The Ballad of Songbirds & Snakes (Music From & Inspired By) was released on November 17, by Geffen Records featuring tracks performed by Zegler, as well as songs performed by established Americana and folk artists, and was led by two singles: "The Hanging Tree (Lucy Gray's version)" was released on October 20, 2023, and "Can't Catch Me Now", performed by Olivia Rodrigo, was released on November 3.

In July 2022, composer James Newton Howard confirmed that he would return to score the film. Howard's score was released on November 17, 2023, by Sony Classical Records.

== Marketing ==
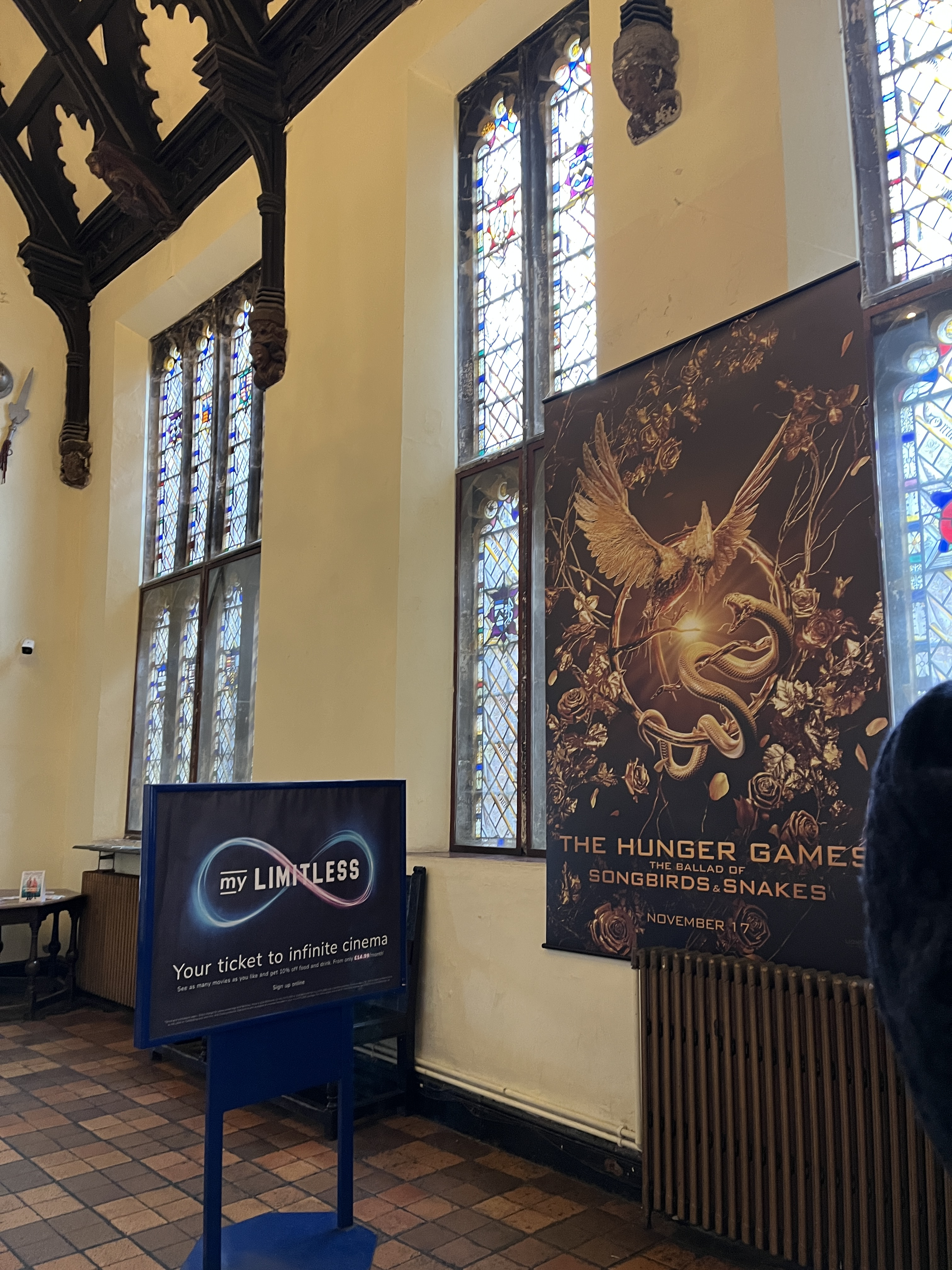
Promotional poster in John Halle's Hall, a medieval hall house now the foyer of the Odeon Cinema, Salisbury, UK, April 15, 2023.

At the 2022 CinemaCom, a teaser was screened to coincide with announcement of the film's official release date of November 17, 2023. On June 5, 2022, a reveal teaser for the film was released. On August 16, 2022, Vanity Fair released an exclusive first look at the film, featuring an image of Coriolanus Snow and Lucy Gray Baird. On April 27, 2023, the first trailer for the film was released followed by a second trailer on September 20 of that year. On October 30, 2023, the film was given an interim agreement so that actors could promote it during the 2023 SAG-AFTRA strike, since Lionsgate is not part of the AMPTP.

== Release ==
On June 30, 2022, it was reported that Lionsgate had inked deals for the film's release in numerous international markets. On November 14, 2022, director Francis Lawrence told Collider that this would be the longest film to date in The Hunger Games franchise, likely longer than the 2-hour-and-26-minute runtime of The Hunger Games: Catching Fire, but hopefully not three hours or longer. The Hunger Games: The Ballad of Songbirds & Snakes had its European premiere in Berlin, Germany on November 5, 2023, its world premiere at the BFI IMAX in London on November 9, 2023, and was released on November 16, in Europe and November 17, 2023, by Lionsgate Films.

=== Home media ===
The Hunger Games: The Ballad of Songbirds & Snakes was released on digital and VOD on December 19, 2023. The film was released on 4K Ultra HD Blu-ray, Blu-ray and DVD on February 13, 2024, by Lionsgate Home Entertainment.

== Reception ==
=== Box office ===
The Hunger Games: The Ballad of Songbirds & Snakes grossed $166.4 million in the United States and Canada, and $195.4 million in other territories, for a worldwide total of $361.8 million.

In the United States and Canada, The Ballad of Songbirds & Snakes was released alongside Next Goal Wins, Trolls Band Together and Thanksgiving, and was projected to gross around $50 million from 3,776 theaters in its opening weekend, with some industry estimates going as low as $45 million or as high as $60 million. The film made $19.1 million on its first day, $5.75 million from Thursday night previews. It went on to debut to $44 million, topping the box office but marking the lowest start of the franchise. The film made $29 million in its second weekend (a drop of 35%, the smallest of both the franchise and of any blockbuster in 2023), remaining in first through the five-day Thanksgiving frame. The film finished in second place each of subsequent three weeks, with grosses of $14.5 million (finishing behind newcomer Renaissance: A Film by Beyoncé), $9.4 million (behind newcomer The Boy and the Heron), and $5.8 million (behind newcomer Wonka). In its sixth weekend the film made $3.5 million, and a total of $5.4 million over the four-day Christmas frame, finishing in seventh.

=== Critical response ===
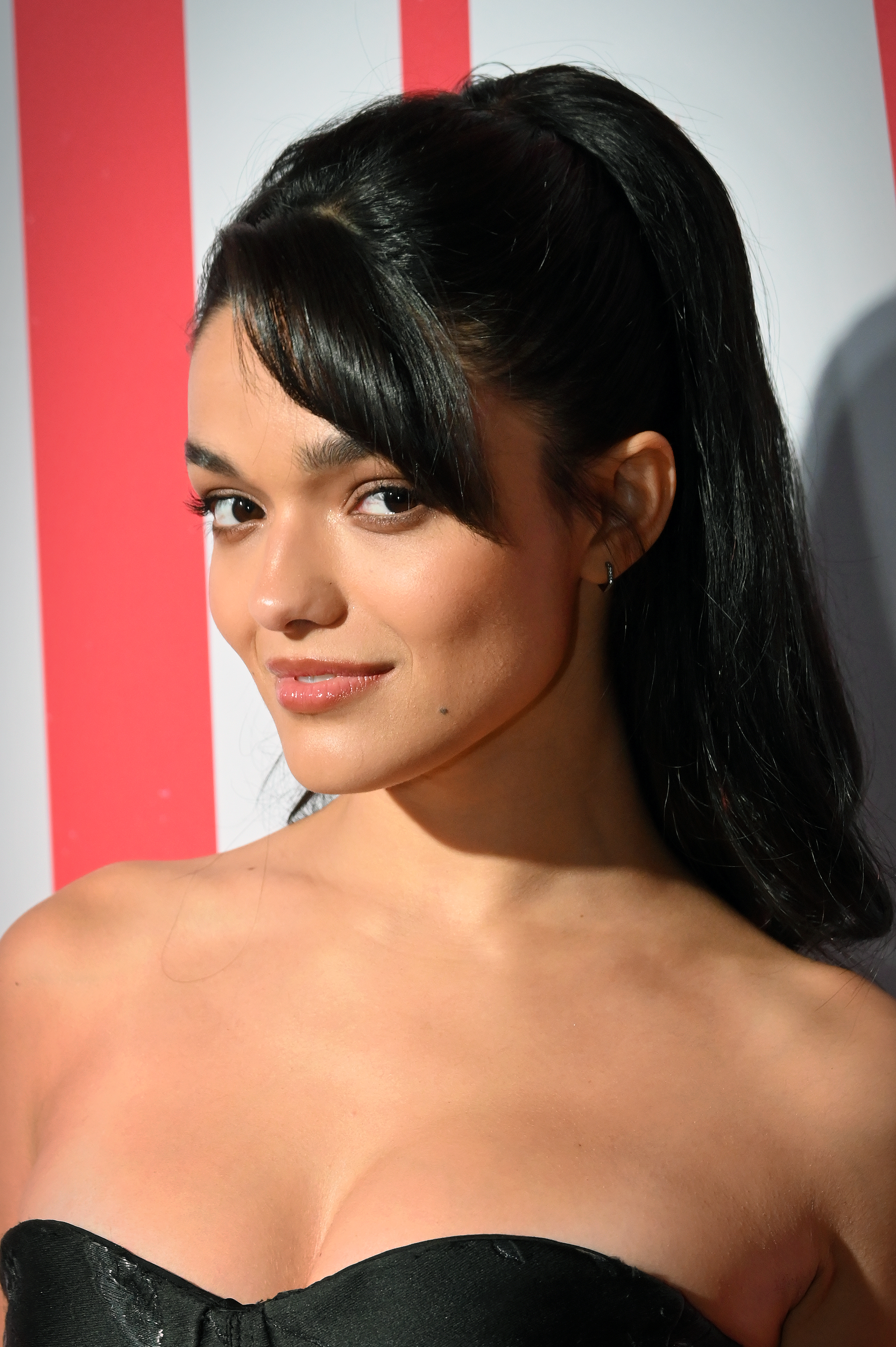
The performances of Tom Blyth, Rachel Zegler and Viola Davis were highly praised by critics.

On the review aggregator website Rotten Tomatoes, 64% of 244 critics' reviews are positive, with an average rating of 6.4/10. The website's consensus reads: "An outstanding cast and exciting story help make The Hunger Games: The Ballad of Songbirds & Snakes a worthy return to Panem in spite of a rushed and somewhat frustrating ending." Metacritic, which uses a weighted average, assigned the film a score of 54 out of 100, based on 53 critics, indicating "mixed or average" reviews. Audiences polled by CinemaScore gave the film an average grade of "B+" on an A+ to F scale, the lowest of the franchise, while those polled by PostTrak gave it an 87% overall positive score, with 70% saying they would definitely recommend the film.

Zoe Guy of Vulture reported that "some critics view the 158-minute spectacle as an overwrought snoozefest, while others argue that Ballad is the most satisfying entry in the entire franchise". NME's Alex Berry meanwhile characterised the initial critical response as "largely negative", noting that "the film has been criticised as lacking in the excitement and drama promised by the trailer, and not living up to the expectation following the first films".

Writing for IndieWire, David Ehrlich named the film both the best young adult dystopian film and "by far" the strongest installment in The Hunger Games film series, describing it as "the rare prequel that manages to stand on its own two feet and still feel taller than the other stories it's ultimately meant to support". RogerEbert.com's Christy Lemire complimented the "subtlety of this supervillain origin story" and described Blyth's performance as Coriolanus Snow as "a star-making performance". Brian Truitt of USA Today praised it as "an enticing blend of dystopian action epic and musical drama that surpasses the previous films". In a negative review for The Guardian, Peter Bradshaw wrote that "the interest, dramatic momentum and energy" of the franchise "have frankly expired", concluding that "this movie finally ties itself into various knots to prefigure the later world of Katniss, but the time to end the Games came long ago". Clarisse Loughrey of The Independent criticized the film for "[squandering] the anger of novelist Suzanne Collins's source material" and "[diluting] its biggest villain", further deriding Snow's characterization as a "yassification of a future monster".

=== Accolades ===
Award	Date of ceremony	Category	Recipients	Result	Ref.
Alliance of Women Film Journalists	January 4, 2024	EDA Special Mention Awards	The Hunger Games: The Ballad of Songbirds & Snakes	Nominated	
Artios Awards	March 7, 2024	The Zeitgeist Award	Debra Zane, Dylan Jury and Simone Bär (Location Casting)	Nominated	
Costume Designers Guild Awards	February 21, 2024	Excellence in Sci-Fi/Fantasy Film	Trish Summerville	Nominated	
Costume Designers Guild Awards	February 21, 2024	Excellence in Costume Illustration	Oksana Nedavniaya	Nominated	
Hollywood Music in Media Awards	November 15, 2023	Original Score – Sci-Fi/Fantasy Film	James Newton Howard	Nominated	
Hollywood Music in Media Awards	November 15, 2023	Original Song – Sci-Fi/Fantasy Film	"Can't Catch Me Now" - Olivia Rodrigo and Dan Nigro	Won	
North Carolina Film Critics Association	January 3, 2024	Best Original Song	"Can't Catch Me Now" - Olivia Rodrigo and Dan Nigro	Nominated	
North Carolina Film Critics Association	January 3, 2024	Ken Hanke Memorial Tar Heel Award	Hunter Schafer	Nominated	
People's Choice Awards	February 18, 2024	Action Movie of the Year	The Hunger Games: The Ballad of Songbirds & Snakes	Won	
People's Choice Awards	February 18, 2024	Female Movie Star of the Year	Viola Davis	Nominated	
People's Choice Awards	February 18, 2024	Female Movie Star of the Year	Rachel Zegler	Nominated	
People's Choice Awards	February 18, 2024	Action Movie Star of the Year	Viola Davis	Nominated	
People's Choice Awards	February 18, 2024	Action Movie Star of the Year	Rachel Zegler	Won	
Saturn Awards	February 2, 2025	Best Science Fiction Film	The Hunger Games: The Ballad of Songbirds & Snakes	Nominated	
Saturn Awards	February 2, 2025	Best Actor in a Film	Tom Blyth	Nominated	
Saturn Awards	February 2, 2025	Best Younger Actor in a Film	Rachel Zegler	Nominated	
Saturn Awards	February 2, 2025	Best Film Music	James Newton Howard	Nominated	
Saturn Awards	February 2, 2025	Best Film Costume Design	Trish Summerville	Nominated	
Set Decorators Society of America Awards	February 13, 2024	Best Achievement in Décor/Design of a Science Fiction or Fantasy Feature Film	Sabine Schaaf and Uli Hanisch	Nominated	
Society of Composers & Lyricists Awards	February 13, 2024	Outstanding Original Song for a Dramatic or Documentary Visual Media Production	"Can't Catch Me Now" – Olivia Rodrigo and Dan Nigro	Won	

== Sequel ==
In June 2024, after another prequel novel was announced, Lionsgate officially confirmed plans for a film adaptation. Francis Lawrence entered early negotiations to direct the film. Taking place 40 years after The Ballad of Songbirds & Snakes and 24 years before the events of The Hunger Games, Sunrise on the Reaping centers on a 16-year-old Haymitch Abernathy (Joseph Zada) as he is reaped for Panem's 50th Games. The film was released on November 20, 2026.

== See also ==
- "Lucy Gray" – 1799 poem by William Wordsworth, after which Lucy Gray Baird is named.
