= Hollywood Music in Media Award for Best Original Song in a Sci-Fi, Fantasy or Horror Film =

Annual motion picture award

The Hollywood Music in Media Award for Best Original Song in a Sci-Fi, Fantasy or Horror Film is one of the awards given annually to people working in the motion picture industry by the Hollywood Music in Media Awards (HMMA). It is presented to the songwriters who have composed the best "original" song, written specifically for a film. The award was first given in 2016, during the seventh annual awards. It was discontinued in 2019, with nominees simply separated by live-action, animation and documentary.

The category was re-introduced in 2023.

== Winners and nominees ==
=== 2010s ===
Year	Film	Song	Nominees
(2016); 7th
(2016); 7th	Alice Through the Looking Glass	"Just like Fire"	Pink, Max Martin, Shellback & Oscar Holter
(2016); 7th	Allegiant	"Scars"	Tove Lo
(2016); 7th	Miss Peregrine’s Home for Peculiar Children	"Wish That You Were Here"	Florence and the Machine
(2016); 7th	Star Trek Beyond	"Sledgehammer"	Sia Furler, Robyn Fenty & Jesse Shatkin
(2016); 7th	Suicide Squad	"Sucker for Pain"	Lil Wayne, Wiz Khalifa, Imagine Dragons, Ty Dolla Sign, Logic, X Ambassadors
(2017); 8th
(2017); 8th	Beauty and the Beast	"How Does a Moment Last Forever"	Alan Menken & Tim Rice
(2017); 8th	Beauty and the Beast	"Evermore"	Alan Menken & Tim Rice
(2017); 8th	Guardians of the Galaxy Vol. 2	"Guardians Inferno"	The Sneepers and David Hasselhoff
(2017); 8th	The Shack	"Keep Your Eyes on Me"	Faith Hill & Tim McGraw
(2018); 9th
(2018); 9th	Black Panther	"All the Stars"	Kendrick Lamar, SZA, Sounwave, and Al Shux
(2018); 9th	Deadpool 2	"Ashes"	Petey Martin, Jordan Smith and Tedd T
(2018); 9th	Mary Poppins Returns	'"The Place Where Lost Things Go"	Marc Shaiman and Scott Wittman
(2018); 9th	Mary Poppins Returns	"Trip a Little Light Fantastic"	Marc Shaiman and Scott Wittman
(2018); 9th	The Nutcracker and the Four Realms	"Fall on Me"	Ian Axel, Chad Vaccarino, Matteo Bocelli and Fortunato Zampaglione

=== 2020s ===
Year	Film	Song	Nominees
(2023); 14th
(2023); 14th	The Hunger Games: The Ballad of Songbirds & Snakes	"Can't Catch Me Now"	Dan Nigro and Olivia Rodrigo
(2023); 14th	Wonka	"A World of Your Own"	Neil Hannon, Simon Farnaby & Paul King
(2023); 14th	The Little Mermaid	"For the First Time"	Alan Menken & Lin-Manuel Miranda
(2023); 14th	The Little Mermaid	"Wild Uncharted Waters"	Alan Menken & Lin-Manuel Miranda
(2023); 14th	Wonka	"You’ve Never Had Chocolate Like This"	Neil Hannon, Simon Farnaby & Paul King
