= The Ballad of Songbirds and Snakes =

2020 novel by Suzanne Collins

- North American first edition cover
- Author: Suzanne Collins
- Language: English
- Series: The Hunger Games
- Genre: Adventure, War, Science fiction, Romance, Action Thriller, Dystopian
- Publisher: Scholastic
- Publication date: May 19, 2020
- Publication place: United States
- Pages: 517
- ISBN: 9780702300172
- Followed by: Sunrise on the Reaping

The Ballad of Songbirds and Snakes is a dystopian young adult action-adventure novel written by the American author Suzanne Collins. It is a prequel to the original The Hunger Games trilogy, set 64 years before the events of the first novel. It was released on May 19, 2020, by Scholastic, with an audiobook of the novel, read by the American actor Santino Fontana, released simultaneously. The book had a virtual launch due to the COVID-19 pandemic. A film adaptation by Lionsgate, The Hunger Games: The Ballad of Songbirds & Snakes, was released on November 17, 2023.

== Background ==
=== Development ===
Regarding the title, Scholastic publisher and editorial director David Levithan stated:

Over a decade ago, Panem provided a very useful lens through which to see our own world, and I think applies as well in 2020, where questions of power and moral choice are as prevalent as ever. It's also fascinating to revisit a place you feel you know, but 64 years earlier.

Author Suzanne Collins also stated:

With this book, I wanted to explore the state of nature, who we are, and what we perceive is required for our survival.

=== Cover art ===
The cover art for the book was designed by Tim O'Brien. It features a golden mockingjay at a new angle, entwined with a snake. Regarding the cover art, VP publisher and editorial director for Scholastic David Levithan stated:

This cover does an extraordinary job of capturing the conflict—both inner and outer—that lies at the heart of The Ballad of Songbirds and Snakes. The mockingjay has returned, but at a new angle . . . which is very much in line with the story that Suzanne Collins is telling.

== Plot ==
To help revive declining popular interest for the upcoming 10th Hunger Games, 24 Capitol Academy students are chosen to mentor tributes, with the mentor of the winning tribute receiving the Plinth Prize, a generous scholarship fund. Eighteen-year-old Coriolanus "Coryo" Snow, heir of a once-powerful but destitute Capitol family, hopes to win the Plinth Prize so that he may pay his way through higher education and restore the Snow family's prestige. Fellow Academy student Sejanus Plinth, heir to the ultra-rich District 2 family that funds the prize, is sympathetic to the plight of district citizens and is ostracized for his background; he considers Coriolanus his only friend, although Coriolanus acts with indifference towards him.

Coriolanus is assigned by Dean Casca Highbottom, the creator of the Hunger Games who inexplicably despises Coriolanus, to the District 12 female tribute, Lucy Gray Baird, a member of the Covey, a nomadic musical group. During the reaping, she catches the Capitol's attention by defiantly singing and by slipping a snake into the dress of Mayfair Lipp, the daughter of District 12's mayor. Although the tributes are starved, kept in a zoo pen, and treated poorly, Coriolanus treats Lucy Gray with uncommon kindness, inspiring other mentors to do the same with their tributes. He smuggles her food and, overcoming their initial mutual mistrust, begins to form a close bond with her.

As part of a class assignment, Coriolanus proposes the addition of betting and sponsored "gifts" to the games to create more interest; sadistic head gamemaker Dr. Volumnia Gaul implements these ideas. As punishment for her lack of contribution to this assignment, Dr. Gaul tests highly venomous genetically modified snakes, nicknamed "snake mutts," on Coriolanus's classmate Clemensia, nearly killing her. Violence between tributes and mentors leaves several dead, and Coriolanus starts considering Lucy Gray a possible victor. He urges her to use her musical abilities in the televised tribute interview to garner Capitol viewers' favor and gifts during the Games. During a tour of the arena used for the Games, rebel bombs explode, killing several more tributes and mentors. Lucy Gray saves Coriolanus from a fallen beam while Marcus, the District 2 male tribute, escapes amid the chaos, only to be later captured, tortured, and left to die in the arena.

The night before the Games, Coriolanus gives Lucy Gray his mother's perfume compact with veiled instructions to fill it with rat poison to use in the arena, and they share their first kiss. At the start of the Games, most tributes hide in the wreckage of the bombed-out arena. Sejanus sneaks into the arena to mourn Marcus, causing Dr. Gaul to send Coriolanus in to retrieve him. Coriolanus succeeds; however, in the process, he kills the District 8 tribute Bobbin in self-defense. The Snow family's finances are further stretched when a new Capitol tax threatens their family home, increasing Coriolanus's drive to win the Games and receive the Plinth Prize. After Coriolanus cheats further by using a handkerchief with Lucy Gray's scent to save her from Dr. Gaul's snake mutts, Lucy Gray wins the Games.

Embarrassed by their failure to sufficiently control the administration of the Games, the Capitol erases all video evidence of events. After the handkerchief that Coriolanus used to save Lucy Gray is discovered, Dean Highbottom realizes that Coriolanus cheated and confronts him. Threatened with his family's public disgrace, Coriolanus reluctantly signs a 20-year contract to become a Peacekeeper, but requests assignment to District 12, hoping to see Lucy Gray again.

In District 12, Coriolanus and Lucy Gray resume their romance. He begins to suspect that Sejanus, who has also been forced into the Peacekeepers as punishment for his actions in the arena, is working with rebels. He uses a jabberjay to secretly record part of a conversation where Sejanus admits his plans to Coriolanus and sends the bird to Dr. Gaul. Coriolanus and Lucy Gray discover Sejanus meeting with rebels and find Lipp eavesdropping with Lucy Gray's ex-boyfriend, Billy Taupe Clade. Coriolanus and the rebels kill the pair, with Coriolanus using a rifle to shoot a fleeing Mayfair to prevent her from revealing his activity to authorities. Coriolanus escapes but leaves the murder weapon behind, which is covered with his fingerprints and DNA. Later, due to Coriolanus's recording, Sejanus is publicly hanged, although Coriolanus's betrayal isn't revealed.

Due to his stellar performance on a qualification exam, Coriolanus is nominated for a prestigious officer position, which could provide a path back to power and prestige in the Capitol. However, he fears the as-yet unfound rifle could implicate him in Lipp and Clade's murders. Feeling he has no other choice, Coriolanus agrees to run away with Lucy Gray. However, while escaping District 12, he accidentally reveals his responsibility for Sejanus' death to Lucy Gray. Coriolanus finds the rifle hidden in a rebel cabin in the woods, and both he and Lucy Gray simultaneously realize that, after disposing of the weapon, she will be the only remaining link to his crimes. Lucy Gray pretends to step outside to gather food but flees, as Coriolanus, desperate to save his future, turns on her. While searching for her in the woods, Coriolanus is bitten by a snake, which he believes was a booby trap set by Lucy Gray. An enraged and delirious Coriolanus chases after and shoots at her with the rifle. Coriolanus hears her sing the last stanza of "The Hanging Tree," and mockingjays echo the melody as Coriolanus fires wildly into the trees, unsure if he hit her. Coriolanus disposes of the murder weapon and returns to District 12, leaving Lucy Gray's ultimate fate unclear.

Coriolanus reports for officer training but is taken to the Capitol, where he meets Dr. Gaul. She arranges a pardon for him and gives him a place in the Capitol university, revealing that she took advantage of Coriolanus's tenure as a Peacekeeper to persuade him into accepting her cynical and cruel views on humanity and governance. Sejanus's parents make him the heir to their family fortune, unaware that he betrayed their son. Coriolanus visits Dean Highbottom, who reveals that his hatred for the Snow family comes from his crushing guilt regarding the Hunger Games' creation. The Games were a drunken idea of his that Coriolanus's father, Crassus, took seriously and proposed to Dr. Gaul against Highbottom's wishes. Highbottom dies after drinking a vial of morphling secretly poisoned by Coriolanus. Becoming a Gamemaker, Coriolanus introduces new reforms such as the Victor's Village and rewards winning districts each year with money and food. This ultimately increases investment and interest in the Games for both the districts and the Capitol and begins his rise to power.

== Characters ==
- Coriolanus "Coryo" Snow – The protagonist of the novel. His family faced financial difficulties following the war, and he makes great efforts to hide this and maintain his social status. He is arrogant, cunning and ruthless, taking whatever actions are necessary to improve his situation.
- Lucy Gray Baird – The female tribute from District 12 for the tenth Hunger Games. Lucy Gray is a member of the Covey, a nomadic musical group forced to settle in District 12 after the war. A smart and calculating free spirit, she develops a romantic connection with Coriolanus.
- Tigris Snow – Coriolanus's cousin. She is the breadwinner of the family, leaving school and working for a fashion designer in order to support herself and her family. It is also implied she is forced to sell her body in order to keep food on the table.
- Sejanus Plinth – Coriolanus's classmate and fellow mentor in the Games. From District 2, Sejanus now lives in the Capitol because of his father's connections and business during the war. He is rebellious and idealistic, and strongly opposes the Capitol's treatment of the Districts and the existence of the Games.
- Dr. Volumnia Gaul – Head Gamemaker and the overseer of every Hunger Games since their inception. She has a twisted view of human nature and believes in an authoritarian government and the need for punishment and control over the Districts.
- Casca Highbottom – Dean of the academy. He is credited as the intellectual author of the Games and holds great disdain towards Coriolanus and the whole Snow family. He is addicted to morphling, a drug similar to morphine. Due to this, Coriolanus and his classmates call him, mockingly, “High-as-a-Kite Bottom”.
- Grandma'am – Coriolanus's and Tigris' paternal grandmother. Her granddaughter gave her the nickname "Grandma'am" since she believed she deserved something that sounded imperial. During the war, she took care of her grandchildren, and ensured their survival.
- Mayfair Lipp – She is the daughter of District 12's mayor. Jealous of Lucy Gray and her relationship with Billy Taupe, she arranges for Lucy Gray to be reaped. Mayfair eventually becomes a spy for the Capitol in its efforts to suppress future rebellions and is murdered by Coriolanus and the rebels.
- Billy Taupe – Lucy Gray's ex-boyfriend and Mayfair's current boyfriend. He and Mayfair are shot after being caught spying on District 12's rebels.
- Strabo Plinth – Sejanus's father. He is the head of a munitions empire in District 2 that sided with the Capitol during the war, thus allowing him to buy his family's way into a new life in the Capitol. At the end of the novel, he sponsors Coriolanus and names him his heir.
- Jessup Diggs - The male tribute from District 12 for the tenth Hunger Games. He is protective and altruistic, making an alliance with Lucy Gray. He contracts rabies from a Capitol raccoon and is indirectly killed by Coriolanus and Lysistrata in order to protect Lucy Gray.

== Release ==
On January 22, 2020, Scholastic announced a world record first printing of 2.5 million copies for the book. Barnes & Noble released an exclusive edition of the title featuring a reader's group guide, as well as a Q&A with author Suzanne Collins and editor David Levithan. Walmart released of an exclusive edition of the title which came with a collectible bookmark. The title was also announced for release as an audiobook narrated by Santino Fontana, a Tony Award-winning actor who has previously narrated titles such as Stephen King's The Institute. This version of the title would be released as a pre-loaded digital audio player, a format intended mainly to be purchased by libraries for patrons to check out and play without the need for any additional equipment. As of October 2019, translation rights for the title had been sold in 28 territories. In a call regarding Scholastic quarterly results, Scholastic CEO Dick Robinson was asked about the possibility of the publication date of The Ballad of Songbirds and Snakes being changed in the wake of the COVID-19 pandemic. He stated that Scholastic was reviewing its options, but that at the time, they strongly felt that they wished to hold on to the May 19 publishing date. Scholastic has warned that they expect sales of the title to be lower than what they anticipated when they first announced it due to the outbreak.

On April 23, 2020, a clip was released of author Suzanne Collins reading a bit less than two minutes of the opening of the book. The scene features Coriolanus Snow fretting about the upcoming reaping for the 10th Hunger Games, eating cabbage to prevent his stomach from growling and worrying over the shirt he would wear to the event. Tigris is revealed as Snow's cousin, who is aiding him with his wardrobe. With stores unable to hold live events due to the pandemic, Barnes & Noble announced a virtual book club on May 29 at 7 P.M. on its Instagram channel. On May 12, 2020, Scholastic Audio released an excerpt of the first 11 minutes of the audiobook edition of the title as read by Santino Fontana. At 12:01 A.M. on the day of the book's release, Suzanne Collins gave a special reading of the title, revealing the answer to the question "Who is the girl from District 12?"

In association with the book's release, Scholastic also released The Ballad of Songbirds and Snakes Journal on the same day as the book itself. The journal is adorned with mockingjays from all four titles in the series and features 192 lined pages, an exclusive Hunger Games design, and a ribbon placeholder.

In association with the premiere of the film adaptation, Scholastic released a trade paperback edition of the title on August 1, 2023. This is the first North American paperback edition of the title. A special movie tie-in edition was also released on September 19, 2023.

== Reception ==
=== Critical response ===
Upon release, The Ballad of Songbirds and Snakes received mixed reviews, with fans and critics alike divided over Collins's choice of Snow as protagonist.

Sarah Lyall of The New York Times gave the book an overall positive review, but felt that its ending feels "flat and desultory" following the excitement of the earlier portions. Constance Grady of Vox described the book as "your apocalyptic escape from our current apocalypse," noting that as the current world grows to feel more apocalyptic, "it can be oddly comforting to escape to a fictional dystopia." Karin Tanabe of The Washington Post gave particular praise to the third and final portion of the book, stating that it is "the most revelatory in terms of the gradual chipping away of Coryo's humanity." She also praises the title for filling in the blanks regarding questions such as "Which unhinged savage came up with kids killing kids?" or "What's the meaning behind the song 'The Hanging Tree'? The Guardian praised the book, writing, "Collins's themes of friendship, betrayal, authority and oppression, as well as the extra layers of lore about mockingjays and Capitol's history, will please and thrill." Similarly, Time said that Collins shines most "as she weaves in tantalising details that lend depth to the gruesome world she created in the original series". Kirkus Reviews gave it a starred review, saying the book is "both a tense, character-driven piece and a cautionary tale".

The Daily Telegraph reviewer criticized it as "not the most promising opening [fans expected]" and said that Collins should "stick to plucky heroes and dazzling plot-twists". She wrote that "when it comes to writing the murkiest backwaters of the human psyche, Collins is fathoms out of her depth". Darren Franich from Entertainment Weekly said, "The storytelling itself trends desperate at times. Chapters close on violent cliffhangers that edge into parody," and that "there are too many folk music interludes [and] some ludicrous franchise callbacks" but overall it "is a major work with major flaws, but it sure gives you a lot to chew on", ultimately giving it a grade of B−. Annalisa Quinn of NPR panned the novel overall, feeling that Coriolanus is ultimately a "flat, wily sociopath," whereas the character of Katniss Everdeen was allowed contradiction, and that The Ballad of Songbirds and Snakes instead tells us what we should think.

Amazon designated the title an "Amazon Best Book of May 2020." Reviewer Seira Wilson of Amazon Book Review stated "It's been a decade since Mockingjay, the final book in the Hunger Games trilogy, was published and fans are going to be thrilled with Suzanne Collins' unexpected prequel, The Ballad of Songbirds and Snakes. This novel has been under serious lockdown, so all that can be said until May 19 is that it begins on the day of the reaping for the tenth annual Hunger Games, and an eighteen-year-old Coriolanus Snow is mentoring the underdog tribute from District 12. Prepare to read this book in one sitting because you won't be able to put it down."

=== Sales ===
On May 16, 2020, the title was #5 on Amazon's "Charts" feature, below John Grisham's Camino Winds and above Stephen King's If It Bleeds and had reached the status of being the company's #1 bestseller in books. The title sold more than 270,000 units in its first week of publication, resulting in a 77.4% jump in sales in the YA fiction category as compared with the previous year.

== Film adaptation ==
In June 2019, Joe Drake, the chairman of the Lionsgate Motion Picture Group, announced that the company was working with Collins on an adaptation of The Ballad of Songbirds and Snakes. By April 2020, Collins and Lionsgate confirmed that plans were underway for the film's development. Casting had not yet begun, but the director Francis Lawrence had been confirmed to return after his success with The Hunger Games series. The film's writer was to be Michael Arndt, with Nina Jacobson and Collins as producers.

In August 2021, Lionsgate's chairman, Joe Drake, revealed that the film was in pre-production with filming expected to begin in early 2022 for a targeted release of "either late fiscal 2023 or early 2024". On April 28, 2022, it was announced that the film would be released on November 17, 2023.

On May 16, 2022, it was announced that Tom Blyth had been cast as the young Coriolanus Snow. On May 31, Rachel Zegler was cast as Lucy Gray Baird. On June 15, Josh Andrés Rivera was cast as Sejanus Plinth. On June 22, Hunter Schafer was cast as Tigris. On June 27, Jason Schwartzman was cast as Lucretius "Lucky" Flickerman. In July, Peter Dinklage was reported to have been cast as Dean Highbottom.

On June 6, 2022, Lionsgate released a teaser trailer for the film, followed by a full trailer on April 27, 2023. On November 17, The Hunger Games: The Ballad of Songbirds & Snakes was released in theaters to mixed reviews from critics.
