= Josh Andrés Rivera =

American actor

- Born: May 1, 1995 (age 31); North Carolina, US
- Education: Ithaca College
- Occupation: Actor

Josh Andrés Rivera (born May 1, 1995) is an American actor. He is best known for starring as Chino in Steven Spielberg's 2021 remake of West Side Story, as Sejanus Plinth in The Hunger Games: The Ballad of Songbirds and Snakes and as Aaron Hernandez in the FX American sports drama anthology series American Sports Story.

== Early life ==
Rivera was born on May 1, 1995, the son of chemists from Puerto Rico who were living in North Carolina. They separated when he was a year old; thereafter, he was raised by his mother in Connecticut and then Boulder, Colorado. He attended Fairview High School, where he played football and was active in music and theater. He then went on to attend Ithaca College, graduating in 2018.

== Career ==
Rivera acted in the first US tour of Hamilton. He rose to prominence for his supporting role as Chino in the Steven Spielberg remake of West Side Story (2021) and as Sejanus Plinth in the film The Hunger Games: The Ballad of Songbirds & Snakes (2023). Rivera portrayed Aaron Hernandez in the limited series American Sports Story (2024). In 2026, he made his Broadway debut as Rocky in The Rocky Horror Show produced by the Roundabout Theatre Company and directed by Tony Award winner Sam Pinkleton. He starred in the short film Shasta which was released as part of the 2026 Fantastic Fest.

== Personal life ==
From 2021 Rivera was in a relationship with Rachel Zegler, whom he met on the set of West Side Story and co-starred with again on The Hunger Games: The Ballad of Songbirds & Snakes. They broke up in 2024.

== Filmography ==
=== TV and film ===
Year	Title	Role	Notes
2021	West Side Story	Chino	
2023	Cat Person	Dave	
2023	The Hunger Games: The Ballad of Songbirds & Snakes	Sejanus Plinth	
2024	American Sports Story	Aaron Hernandez	Lead role
2025	Inhabitants	Francis Morales	Lead role
2026	Shasta	Joe Martinez	Short film

=== Theatre ===
Year	Title	Role	Venue	Ref.
2016	Evita	Ensemble	Regional, Cabrillo Music Theatre	
2017	West Side Story	Indio	Regional, La Mirada Theatre for the Performing Arts	
2017-2020	Hamilton	Swing	U.S. National Tour	
2026	The Rocky Horror Show	Rocky Horror	Broadway, Studio 54	

== Awards and nominations ==
Year	Award	Category	Work	Result	Ref.
2025	Imagen Foundation Awards	Best Actor - Drama	American Sports Story: Aaron Hernandez	Nominated	
