= The Hunger Games (franchise) =

American media franchise

- Official franchise logo
- Created by: Suzanne Collins
- Original work: The Hunger Games (2008)
- Owners: Lionsgate Studios; Suzanne Collins (publishing rights)
- Years: 2008–present

Print publications
- Novel: The Hunger Games series

Films and television
- Films: The Hunger Games (2012); Catching Fire (2013); Mockingjay – Part 1 (2014); Mockingjay – Part 2 (2015); The Ballad of Songbirds & Snakes (2023); Sunrise on the Reaping (2026)

Theatrical presentations
- Play: The Hunger Games: On Stage (2025)

Audio
- Soundtracks: Songs from District 12 and Beyond (2012); The Hunger Games (2012); Catching Fire (soundtrack) (2013); Catching Fire (score) (2013); Mockingjay – Part 1 (soundtrack) (2014); Mockingjay – Part 1 (score) (2014); Mockingjay – Part 2 (2015); The Ballad of Songbirds & Snakes (soundtrack) (2023); The Ballad of Songbirds & Snakes (score) (2023); Sunrise on the Reaping (soundtrack) (2026)

Miscellaneous
- Theme park attraction: The World of the Hunger Games

The Hunger Games is an American media franchise centering on a series of dystopian films, based on the novel series by Suzanne Collins. In a future North America known as "Panem", the elite of the country's Capitol punish the rebel districts by forcing their children to compete to the death in "The Hunger Games". The series features an ensemble cast including Jennifer Lawrence, Josh Hutcherson, Liam Hemsworth, Woody Harrelson, Elizabeth Banks, Stanley Tucci, and Donald Sutherland.

The series set box office records, the first film set records for biggest opening day and biggest opening weekend for a non-sequel. The films praised for their themes and Lawrence's performance. The series is the 21st-highest-grossing film franchise of all time, having grossed $3.3 billion worldwide.

== Background ==
Following the release of Suzanne Collins's novel The Hunger Games on September 14, 2008, Hollywood film studios began looking to adapt the book into film. In March 2009, Color Force, an independent studio founded by producer Nina Jacobson, bought the film rights to the book. She then sought out production company Lionsgate to help her produce the film. Collins was also attached to adapt the novel; she began the first draft after completing the third novel in the series, Mockingjay (2010). The search for a director began in 2010 with three directors in the running; David Slade, Sam Mendes, and Gary Ross. Ross was ultimately chosen to direct. By the time Collins had finished the script, Ross decided to go through the script with Collins and screenwriter Billy Ray.

In October 2010, scripts were sent to the actors, and casting occurred between March and May 2011. The first role cast was of the protagonist, Katniss Everdeen. As many as thirty actresses were in talks to play the part, with Jennifer Lawrence, Hailee Steinfeld, Abigail Breslin, and Chloë Grace Moretz being mentioned most. The role was given to Lawrence.

Casting for the roles of Peeta Mellark, Katniss' fellow tribute, and Gale Hawthorne, her best friend, began later that month. Top contenders for Peeta included Josh Hutcherson, Alexander Ludwig (later cast as Cato), Hunter Parrish, Evan Peters, and Lucas Till. Contenders for Gale included Robbie Amell, Liam Hemsworth, David Henrie, and Drew Roy. On April 4, it was reported that Hemsworth had been cast as Gale, and Hutcherson had been cast as Peeta.

In May 2022, Tom Blyth was cast as the young President Snow, with Rachel Zegler as his protégée, tribute Lucy Gray Baird. Zegler was originally offered the role in January, but initially turned it down before later changing her mind. In June 2022, Josh Andrés Rivera (who previously starred in 2021's West Side Story alongside Zegler), Hunter Schafer and Jason Schwartzman were cast. Peter Dinklage was cast in the following month. Throughout June and July 2022, the cast was rounded out with actors portraying the film's multiple tributes and mentors. On August 15, 2022, it was reported that Viola Davis was cast as Volumnia Gaul, the head gamemaker of the 10th annual Hunger Games. On September 16, 2022, more cast members were revealed, including Burn Gorman and Fionnula Flanagan as Commander Hoff and Grandma'am.

== Films ==
The Hunger Games films
Film	U.S. release date	Directed by	Screenplay by	Produced by
The Hunger Games	March 23, 2012	Gary Ross	Gary Ross, Billy Ray & Suzanne Collins	Jon Kilik & Nina Jacobson
The Hunger Games: Catching Fire	November 22, 2013	Francis Lawrence	Simon Beaufoy & Michael Arndt (Note: Credited as Michael deBruyn.)	Jon Kilik & Nina Jacobson
The Hunger Games: Mockingjay – Part 1	November 21, 2014	Francis Lawrence	Peter Craig & Danny Strong; Adaptation by: Suzanne Collins	Jon Kilik & Nina Jacobson
The Hunger Games: Mockingjay – Part 2	November 20, 2015	Francis Lawrence	Peter Craig & Danny Strong; Adaptation by: Suzanne Collins	Jon Kilik & Nina Jacobson
The Hunger Games: The Ballad of Songbirds & Snakes	November 17, 2023	Francis Lawrence	Michael Lesslie & Michael Arndt	Brad Simpson, Nina Jacobson & Francis Lawrence
The Hunger Games: Sunrise on the Reaping	November 20, 2026	Francis Lawrence	Michael Lesslie & Billy Ray	Brad Simpson, Nina Jacobson & Francis Lawrence

=== The Hunger Games (2012) ===
Every year, in the ruins of what was once North America, the Capitol of the nation of Panem forces each of the 12 districts to send one boy and one girl tribute between the ages of 12 to 18 to compete in the Hunger Games: a nationally televised event in which the 'tributes' fight each other to the death until one survivor remains. When Primrose Everdeen is "reaped", her older sister Katniss volunteers in her place as tribute to enter the games and is forced to rely upon her sharp instincts and knowledge when she's pitted against highly trained and fierce "tributes" from all of the other districts.

=== The Hunger Games: Catching Fire (2013) ===
Along with fellow District 12 victor Peeta Mellark, Katniss Everdeen returns home after winning the 74th Hunger Games. Winning means that they must leave their loved ones behind and embark on a Victory Tour throughout the districts for a couple of days. Along the way, Katniss senses a rebellion simmering upon the Capitol, one that she and Peeta may have sparked. President Snow prepares for the 75th Hunger Games, the Third Quarter Quell in which past victors are reaped, that may change Panem forever.

=== The Hunger Games: Mockingjay – Part 1 (2014) ===
Following her rescue from the devastating Quarter Quell, Katniss Everdeen awakes in the complex beneath the supposedly destroyed District 13. Her home, District 12, has been reduced to rubble by the Capitol. Peeta Mellark was kidnapped by the Capitol and is now brainwashed and being held captive by President Snow. Snow wants Peeta to forget everything he had loved about Katniss. At the same time, Katniss also learns about a secret rebellion spreading throughout Panem - a rebellion that places her at the center of attention, and compels her to turn the tables on President Snow.

=== The Hunger Games: Mockingjay – Part 2 (2015) ===
Realizing the stakes are no longer just for survival, Katniss Everdeen teams up with her closest friends, Peeta Mellark, Gale Hawthorne, and Finnick Odair, on the ultimate mission for peace. Together, they leave District 13, to liberate citizens from a war that tears Panem apart more than ever. President Snow becomes obsessed with destroying Katniss and everyone and everything she loves. Ahead lie mortal traps, dangerous enemies, and moral choices that will determine the future of millions.

=== The Hunger Games: The Ballad of Songbirds & Snakes (2023) ===
A young Coriolanus is the last hope for his failing lineage, since the once-proud Snow family has fallen from grace in a post-war Capitol. With his livelihood threatened, Snow is reluctantly assigned to mentor Lucy Gray Baird, a tribute from the impoverished District 12. After Lucy Gray's charm captivates the audience of Panem, however, Snow sees an opportunity to shift their fates. With everything he has worked for hanging in the balance, Snow unites with Lucy Gray to turn the odds in their favor. Battling his instincts for both good and evil, Snow sets out on a race against time to survive and reveal if he will ultimately sing a songbird or a monster.

=== The Hunger Games: Sunrise on the Reaping (2026) ===
A 16-year-old Haymitch Abernathy is reaped for Panem's Second Quarter Quell, and must form alliances and work not only to survive the Games, but end them once and for all.

== Cast and crew ==
List indicators

This section includes characters who will appear or have appeared in more than two films in the series.

- An empty grey cell indicates the character was not in the film, or that the character's official presence has not yet been confirmed.
- ^{A} indicates an appearance through archival footage or audio.
- ^{C} indicates a cameo role.
- ^{O} indicates an older version of the character.
- ^{V} indicates a voice-only role.
- ^{Y} indicates a younger version of the character.

Character
Character	The Hunger Games	Catching Fire	Mockingjay – Part 1	Mockingjay – Part 2	The Ballad of Songbirds & Snakes	Sunrise on the Reaping
Character	2012	2013	2014	2015	2023	2026
Coriolanus Snow	Donald Sutherland	Donald Sutherland	Donald Sutherland	Donald Sutherland	Tom Blyth Dexter Sol Ansell^{Y} Donald Sutherland ^{A}^{V}^{C}	Ralph Fiennes
Katniss Everdeen	Jennifer Lawrence	Jennifer Lawrence	Jennifer Lawrence	Jennifer Lawrence		Jennifer Lawrence^{C}
Peeta Mellark	Josh Hutcherson	Josh Hutcherson	Josh Hutcherson	Josh Hutcherson		Josh Hutcherson^{C}
Haymitch Abernathy	Woody Harrelson	Woody Harrelson	Woody Harrelson	Woody Harrelson		Joseph Zada^{Y} Woody Harrelson^{O}^{C}
Effie Trinket	Elizabeth Banks	Elizabeth Banks	Elizabeth Banks	Elizabeth Banks		Elle Fanning
Caesar Flickerman	Stanley Tucci	Stanley Tucci	Stanley Tucci	Stanley Tucci		Kieran Culkin
Asterid Everdeen	Paula Malcomson	Paula Malcomson	Paula Malcomson	Paula Malcomson		Grace Ackary
Gale Hawthorne	Liam Hemsworth	Liam Hemsworth	Liam Hemsworth	Liam Hemsworth		
Primrose Everdeen	Willow Shields	Willow Shields	Willow Shields	Willow Shields		
Cinna	Lenny Kravitz	Lenny Kravitz				
Plutarch Heavensbee		Philip Seymour Hoffman	Philip Seymour Hoffman	Philip Seymour Hoffman		Jesse Plemons
Beetee Latier		Jeffrey Wright	Jeffrey Wright	Jeffrey Wright		Kelvin Harrison Jr.
Finnick Odair		Sam Claflin	Sam Claflin	Sam Claflin		
Johanna Mason		Jena Malone	Jena Malone	Jena Malone		
Annie Cresta		Stef Dawson	Stef Dawson	Stef Dawson		
Mags Flanagan		Lynn Cohen				Lili Taylor
Wiress		Amanda Plummer				Maya Hawke
President Alma Coin			Julianne Moore	Julianne Moore		
Boggs			Mahershala Ali	Mahershala Ali		
Cressida			Natalie Dormer	Natalie Dormer		
Messalla			Evan Ross	Evan Ross		
Castor			Wes Chatham	Wes Chatham		
Pollux			Elden Henson	Elden Henson		
Commander Paylor			Patina Miller	Patina Miller		
Tigris Snow				Eugenie Bondurant	Hunter Schafer Rosa Gotzler^{Y}	
Lucy Gray Baird					Rachel Zegler	
Sejanus Plinth					Josh Andrés Rivera	
Casca Highbottom					Peter Dinklage	
Lucretius "Lucky" Flickerman					Jason Schwartzman	
Dr. Volumnia Gaul					Viola Davis	
Commander Hoff					Burn Gorman	
Clemensia Dovecote					Ashley Liao	
Festus Creed					Max Raphael	
Lysistrata Vickers					Zoe Renee	
Lenore Dove Baird						Whitney Peak
Maysilee Donner						Mckenna Grace
Wyatt Callow						Ben Wang
Louella McCoy						Molly McCann
Lou Lou						Iona Bell
Ampert Latier						Percy Daggs IV
Sid Abernathy						Smylie Bradwell
Proserpina Trinket						Iris Apatow
Vitus						Edvin Ryding
Drusilla Sickle						Glenn Close
Magno Stift						Billy Porter

=== Additional crew ===
Film	Crew/Detail					
Film	Composer(s)	Cinematographer	Editor(s)	Production companies	Distributing company	Running time
The Hunger Games	James Newton Howard	Tom Stern	Stephen Mirrione & Juliette Welfling	Lionsgate & Color Force	Lionsgate	142 minutes
Catching Fire	James Newton Howard	Jo Willems	Alan Edward Bell	Lionsgate & Color Force	Lionsgate	146 minutes
Mockingjay – Part 1	James Newton Howard	Jo Willems	Mark Yoshikawa & Alan Edward Bell	Lionsgate & Color Force	Lionsgate	123 minutes
Mockingjay – Part 2	James Newton Howard	Jo Willems	Mark Yoshikawa & Alan Edward Bell	Lionsgate & Color Force	Lionsgate	137 minutes
The Ballad of Songbirds & Snakes	James Newton Howard	Jo Willems	Mark Yoshikawa	Lionsgate & Color Force	Lionsgate	157 minutes
Sunrise on the Reaping	James Newton Howard	Jo Willems	Mark Yoshikawa	Lionsgate & Color Force	Lionsgate	158 minutes

== Production ==
=== Development ===
Filming for the franchise began on May 23, 2011, and finished on June 20, 2014.

Suzanne Collins and Louise Rosner acted as executive producers on the first two films. Other executive producers of the first film include Robin Bissell and Shantal Feghali. Co-producers are Diana Alvarez, Martin Cohen, Louis Phillips, Bryan Unkeless, and Aldric La'auli Porter. Color Force and Lionsgate collaborated on all four films. It was announced on November 1, 2012, that the studio had decided to split the final book, Mockingjay (2010), into two films: The Hunger Games: Mockingjay – Part 1 (2014) and The Hunger Games: Mockingjay – Part 2 (2015), much like Harry Potter and the Deathly Hallows – Part 1 (2010) and 2 (2011), and The Twilight Saga: Breaking Dawn – Part 1 (2011) and 2 (2012).

=== Directors ===
Gary Ross directed the first film (The Hunger Games), and despite initially stating otherwise on April 10, 2012, Lionsgate announced that Ross would not return to direct the sequel. On April 19, 2012, it was confirmed that Francis Lawrence would direct the sequel instead, and on November 1, 2012, it was confirmed that Lawrence would return and direct the final two films in the series, based on the novel Mockingjay. In April 2020, Collins and Lionsgate confirmed that plans were underway for the prequel film's development. Francis Lawrence was later confirmed to direct, after doing so for the prior three films in the series since The Hunger Games: Catching Fire.

=== Scripts ===
Suzanne Collins began adapting the first book to film after she finished writing Mockingjay. Collins had experience in writing screenplays after writing Clifford's Puppy Days and other children's television shows. When Gary Ross was announced as director for the film in 2010, he began to work with Collins and veteran writer Billy Ray to bring the novel to life. After Francis Lawrence took over as director, he brought in Simon Beaufoy and Michael Arndt to write the script for Catching Fire. The final two films of the series were written by Danny Strong and Peter Craig. The prequel films of the series were written by Michael Arndt and Michael Lesslie.

=== Casting ===
Once the three leads were cast, casting shifted to the other tributes. Jack Quaid was cast as Marvel, Leven Rambin as Glimmer, Amandla Stenberg as Rue, and Dayo Okeniyi as Thresh. Alexander Ludwig (who auditioned for Peeta) was cast as Cato, Isabelle Fuhrman (who auditioned for Katniss) as Clove, and Jacqueline Emerson as Foxface. Following the casting of tributes, the adult cast began to come together. Elizabeth Banks was cast as Effie Trinket, the District 12 escort. Woody Harrelson was cast as Haymitch Abernathy, District 12's mentor. Lenny Kravitz was cast as Cinna, Katniss' stylist. Wes Bentley was cast as gamemaker Seneca Crane. Stanley Tucci was cast as Caesar Flickerman, Panem's celebrity host. Donald Sutherland was cast as Coriolanus Snow, Panem's president. Willow Shields was cast as Primrose Everdeen, Katniss' younger sister.

In July 2012, the cast for the second film was announced. Jena Malone would play Johanna Mason. Philip Seymour Hoffman would play Plutarch Heavensbee. Sam Claflin would play Finnick Odair. It was later announced that Jeffrey Wright was cast as Beetee, Alan Ritchson as Gloss, Lynn Cohen as Mags, and Amanda Plummer as Wiress.

In August and September 2013, it was revealed that Stef Dawson would play Annie Cresta, Natalie Dormer would play Cressida, Evan Ross would play Messalla, and Julianne Moore would play President Alma Coin in the final two films.

In May 2022, it was announced that Tom Blyth was cast as the younger version of Coriolanus Snow in the prequel film. Later the same month, Rachel Zegler was cast in the role of Lucy Gray Baird. The following month, Josh Andrés Rivera, Hunter Schafer and Jason Schwartzman were cast in the roles of Sejanus Plinth, Tigris Snow and Lucretius "Lucky" Flickerman respectively.

=== Filming ===
Principal photography for The Hunger Games began on May 24, 2011, and concluded on September 15, 2011. Charlotte, North Carolina, was used for the Capitol scenes. An abandoned village in Hickory, North Carolina, was the filming location for District 12. The arena scenes were filmed on the outskirts of Wilmington, North Carolina. Principal photography for The Hunger Games: Catching Fire began on September 10, 2012, in Atlanta, Georgia, and concluded in April 2013. In November 2012, production moved to Hawaii to film the arena scenes. Filming took a Christmas break before filming resumed for two weeks in mid-January. In March 2013, the film went back to Hawaii for re-shoots. Atlanta was used for all Capitol scenes. Hawaii for the arena scenes, and Oakland, New Jersey, for District 12 scenes.

Principal photography for The Hunger Games: Mockingjay began on September 23, 2013 and concluded on June 20, 2014. The majority of filming for the Mockingjay films was done in soundstages in a studio in Atlanta, until April 18, 2014. Production then moved to Paris, with filming beginning there on May 5, 2014.

Philip Seymour Hoffman, who portrays Plutarch Heavensbee, died on February 2, 2014. At the time of his death, he had completed filming his scenes for The Hunger Games: Mockingjay – Part 1 and had a week left of shooting for Part 2. Lionsgate released a statement stating that, since the majority of Hoffman's scenes were completed, the release date for Part 2 would not be affected.

Principal photography for The Hunger Games: The Ballad of Songbirds & Snakes began in Wrocław, Poland, on July 11, 2022, and ended in Berlin, Germany, on November 5, 2022. Filming locations included the Monument to the Battle of the Nations in Leipzig and the Centennial Hall in Wrocław. Some scenes in the film were also shot in the "Landschaftspark Duisburg-Nord" in Duisburg in North Rhine-Westphalia.

== Reception ==
=== Box office performance ===
Film	Year	Box office gross			Box office ranking		Budget	References
Film	Year	North America	Other territories	Worldwide	All time North America	All time worldwide	Budget	References
The Hunger Games	2012	$408,010,692	$287,209,927	$695,220,619	42	148	$78 million	
The Hunger Games: Catching Fire	2013	$424,668,047	$440,343,699	$865,011,746	32	83	$130 million	
The Hunger Games: Mockingjay – Part 1	2014	$337,135,885	$418,221,218	$755,357,103	72	114	$125 million	
The Hunger Games: Mockingjay – Part 2	2015	$281,723,902	$379,732,661	$661,456,563	118	163	$160 million	
The Hunger Games: The Ballad of Songbirds & Snakes	2023	$166,350,594	$182,549,425	$348,900,019	352	494	$100 million	
The Hunger Games: Sunrise on the Reaping	2026	$120,000,000	$105,000,000	$225,000,000			$150 million	
Total		$1,737,889,120	$1,813,056,930	$3,550,946,050			$743 million	

The series set various box office records. The Hunger Games (2012) set records for biggest opening day and biggest opening weekend for a non-sequel. Catching Fire (2013) set the record for biggest opening weekend of November. Mockingjay – Part 1 (2014) had the largest opening day and weekend of 2014. All The Hunger Games films finished first at the North American box office during both their opening and second weekend. In North America, The Hunger Games film series is the second highest-grossing film series based on young adult books, after the Harry Potter series, earning over $1.4 billion. Worldwide, it is the third highest-grossing film series based on young-adult books after the film series of Harry Potter and The Twilight Saga, respectively, having grossed over $3 billion. In North America, it is the eighth highest-grossing film franchise of all time. As of January 2024, it is the 20th highest-grossing film franchise of all time worldwide.

=== Critical and public response ===
Film	Rotten Tomatoes	Metacritic	CinemaScore
The Hunger Games	84% (319 reviews)	68 (49 reviews)	A
The Hunger Games: Catching Fire	90% (297 reviews)	76 (49 reviews)	A
The Hunger Games: Mockingjay – Part 1	70% (308 reviews)	64 (46 reviews)	A−
The Hunger Games: Mockingjay – Part 2	70% (294 reviews)	65 (45 reviews)	A−
The Hunger Games: The Ballad of Songbirds & Snakes	64% (232 reviews)	54 (52 reviews)	B+
The Hunger Games: Sunrise on the Reaping	68% (176 reviews)	56 (39 reviews)	A-

The first four installments of the Hunger Games series received positive reviews from critics. The first two installments (notably the second) were critically acclaimed, while the next two films were met with generally positive responses from critics, while the fifth installment received mixed reviews. The five films in The Hunger Games franchise received ratings of over 60 percent on the review aggregation website Rotten Tomatoes (the first two films received a rating of over 75 percent).

== Music ==
=== Soundtracks ===
Title	U.S. release date	Length	Performed by	Label
The Hunger Games: Songs from District 12 and Beyond	March 20, 2012	58:10	Various Artists	Universal Republic
The Hunger Games (Original Motion Picture Score)	March 26, 2012	42:16	James Newton Howard	Universal Republic
The Hunger Games: Catching Fire (Original Motion Picture Soundtrack)	November 19, 2013	47:58	Various Artists	Republic
The Hunger Games: Catching Fire (Original Motion Picture Score)	November 25, 2013	74:58	James Newton Howard	Republic
The Hunger Games: Mockingjay – Part 1 (Original Motion Picture Soundtrack)	November 17, 2014	50:11	Various Artists	Republic
The Hunger Games: Mockingjay – Part 1 (Original Motion Picture Score)	November 24, 2014	69:38	James Newton Howard	Republic
The Hunger Games: Mockingjay – Part 2 (Original Motion Picture Soundtrack)	November 23, 2015	60:13	James Newton Howard	Republic
The Hunger Games: The Ballad of Songbirds & Snakes (Music From & Inspired by)	November 17, 2023	49:56	Various Artists	Geffen
The Hunger Games: The Ballad of Songbirds & Snakes (Original Motion Picture Score)	November 17, 2023	87:06	James Newton Howard featuring Yuja Wang	Sony Masterworks
The Hunger Games: Sunrise on the Reaping (The Album)	November 13, 2026	99:52	Various Artists	MCA
The Hunger Games: Sunrise on the Reaping – The Score	November 20, 2026	87:28	James Newton Howard	MCA

=== Singles ===
Title	U.S. release date	Length	Artist(s)	Label	Film
"Safe & Sound"	December 26, 2011	3:37	Taylor Swift featuring the Civil Wars	Big Machine	The Hunger Games
"One Engine"	February 13, 2012	3:01	The Decemberists	Universal Republic	The Hunger Games
"Eyes Open"	March 27, 2012	4:04	Taylor Swift	Big Machine	The Hunger Games
"Atlas"	September 6, 2013	3:56	Coldplay	Parlophone	Catching Fire
"Elastic Heart"	October 1, 2013	4:18	Sia featuring the Weeknd and Diplo	RCA; Republic; Lionsgate	Catching Fire
"We Remain"	October 1, 2013	4:00	Christina Aguilera	RCA; Republic; Lionsgate	Catching Fire
"Yellow Flicker Beat"	September 29, 2014	3:52	Lorde	Republic	Mockingjay – Part 1
"All My Love"	November 13, 2014	3:32	Major Lazer featuring Ariana Grande	Republic	Mockingjay – Part 1
"The Hanging Tree"	December 9, 2014	3:38	James Newton Howard featuring Jennifer Lawrence	Republic	Mockingjay – Part 1
"Deep in the Meadow" (Baauer Remix)	November 23, 2015	3:11	Baauer featuring Jennifer Lawrence	Republic	Mockingjay – Part 2
"The Hanging Tree" (Lucy Gray's Version)	October 20, 2023	2:25	Rachel Zegler	Geffen	The Ballad of Songbirds & Snakes
"Can't Catch Me Now"	November 3, 2023	3:25	Olivia Rodrigo	Geffen	The Ballad of Songbirds & Snakes
"Mercy"	November 7, 2023	2:21	James Newton Howard	Sony Masterworks	The Ballad of Songbirds & Snakes
"The Old Therebefore"	February 9, 2024	2:27	Rachel Zegler	Universal Music Group	The Ballad of Songbirds & Snakes
"Love Reign O'er Me" (Boomerang remix)	May 30, 2026	3:08	The Who	Universal Music Group	Sunrise on the Reaping
"Draw You Out"	October 2, 2026	4:15	Noah Kahan	MCA	Sunrise on the Reaping
"Black Stars"	October 16, 2026	3:26	The Smashing Pumpkins	MCA	Sunrise on the Reaping
"Haymitch Meets Snow"	October 23, 2026	2:15	James Newton Howard	MCA	Sunrise on the Reaping

== Theme park ==
A themed area named The World of the Hunger Games was opened at Motiongate Dubai on October 20, 2017.

== Stage play ==
The Hunger Games: On Stage, a stage production based on the first novel and first film of The Hunger Games, premiered in 2025 in the West End. The play was written by Conor McPherson and directed by Matthew Dunster.

== See also ==
- Battle royale genre
