= Pawn Sacrifice (score) =

2015 EP / film score by James Newton Howard

Pawn Sacrifice (Original Motion Picture Soundtrack)

EP / film score by James Newton Howard
- Released: September 11, 2015
- Recorded: 2014–2015
- Studio: Abbey Road Studios, London
- Genre: Film score
- Length: 23:30
- Label: Lakeshore
- Producer: James Newton Howard; Sven Faulconer

James Newton Howard chronology
The Hunger Games: Mockingjay – Part 1 (2014)	Pawn Sacrifice (Original Motion Picture Soundtrack) (2015)	The Hunger Games: Mockingjay – Part 2 (2015)

Pawn Sacrifice (Original Motion Picture Soundtrack) is the film score soundtrack / extended play composed by James Newton Howard for the 2014 biographical psychological drama film Pawn Sacrifice, directed by Edward Zwick based on the life of chess grandmaster and 11th world champion Bobby Fischer, and starring Tobey Maguire as Fischer. The film score was released through Lakeshore Records on September 11, 2015, five days ahead of the film's theatrical release.

== Background and release ==
On May 6, 2014, it was announced that James Newton Howard would compose the musical score for Pawn Sacrifice. Howard had previously worked with Zwick on Blood Diamond (2006), Defiance (2008) and Love & Other Drugs (2010). The score was recorded at the Abbey Road Studios in London during 2014–2015, orchestrated by Pete Anthony and conducted by Gavin Greenaway. The orchestral portions reflect the psychological nature of Fleischer's mind. The score was released under the Lakeshore Records label on September 11, 2015; the album consisted of eight tracks running for 23 minutes.

== Reception ==
Jordan Mintzer of The Hollywood Reporter called it as a "workable score by James Newton Howard". Justin Chang of Variety called it as a "moody", and Vaughan Grey of Rain Man Digital described it as an "uplifting score". Richard Brody of The New Yorker described it as "melancholic".

The score was shortlisted as one among the 118 contenders for Academy Award for Best Original Score at the 88th Academy Awards. At the 52nd Karlovy Vary International Film Festival held in Czech Republic, where Howard was honored with the Crystal Globe for Outstanding Artistic Contribution to World Cinema, he cited the film's score which he was particularly proud of.

== Track listing ==
No.	Title	Length
1.	"There's Usually One Right Move"	3:09
2.	"Bobby Plays Carmine"	1:58
3.	"Ping Pong"	3:35
4.	"Boris Spassky"	1:51
5.	"Reading About Spassky"	1:29
6.	"Forfeit"	4:37
7.	"Bobby Plays Boris"	1:05
8.	"Bobby Wins"	5:46
Total length:		23:30

== Personnel ==
Credits adapted from liner notes

- Music – James Newton Howard
- Producer – James Newton Howard, Sven Faulconer
- Arrangements – Sunna Wehrmeijer, Sven Faulconer
- Programming – Sunna Wehrmeijer, Sven Faulconer, Christopher Wray
- Recording engineer – Simon Rhodes
- Mixing engineer – Matt Ward
- Mixing assistance – Carl Schroeder
- Score editor – David Olson
- Supervising score editor – Jim Weidman
- Auricle control systems – Andy Glen, Richard Grant
- Scoring co-ordinator – Pamela Sollie
- A&R – Eric Craig
- Art direction – John Bergin

Orchestra

- Orchestration – Pete Anthony
- Conductor – Gavin Greenaway
- Orchestra leader – Gabrielle Lester
- Contractor – Isobel Griffiths
- Assistant contractor – Jo Changer
- Copyist – Joann Kane Music Service, Mark Graham
- Music librarian – Dave Hage

Instruments

- Bass – Allen Walley, Mary Scully, Steve Mair
- Cello – Anthony Lewis, Dave Daniels, Frank Schaefer, Jonathan Williams, Josephine Knight, Martin Loveday, Nick Cooper, Paul Kegg
- Clarinet – Barnaby Robson
- Harp – Skaila Kanga
- Piano – Simon Chamberlain
- Viola – Andy Parker, Bruce White, Gustav Clarkson, Julia Knight, Paul Cassidy, Peter Lale, Rachel Bolt, Rusen Gunes, Steve Wright, Sue Dench
- Violin – Boguslaw Kostecki, Cathy Thompson, Chris Tombling, Debbie Widdup, Emlyn Singleton, Everton Nelson, Gabrielle Lester, Jackie Hartley, Jonathan Evans-Jones, Mark Berrow, Natalia Bonner, Patrick Kiernan, Paul Willey, Perry Montague-Mason, Philippa Ibbotson, Rita Manning, Roger Garland, Tom Pigott Smith
