= Black Stars (song) =

Single by the Smashing Pumpkins

from the album The Hunger Games: Sunrise on the Reaping (The Album)
- Released: October 16, 2026
- Studio: Chaplin Studios
- Length: 3:26
- Label: MCA
- Songwriter: William Patrick Corgan
- Producer: Butch Vig

The Smashing Pumpkins singles chronology
"Zombie" (2026)	"Black Stars" (2026)

The Hunger Games singles chronology
"Draw You Out" (2026)	"Black Stars" (2026)

Music video
- "Black Stars" on YouTube

"Black Stars" is a song by American alternative rock band the Smashing Pumpkins for the soundtrack of the 2026 film The Hunger Games: Sunrise on the Reaping. Written by William Patrick Corgan and produced by Butch Vig, it was released on October 16, 2026, as the soundtrack's second single by MCA.

== Background ==
Billy Corgan originally began writing "Black Stars" for a solo project, reuniting with producer Butch Vig for the first time since 1993, and teased working on a new song with Vig in May 2026. After being invited to contribute an original song for The Hunger Games: Sunrise on the Reaping, Corgan and Vig selected it as a song they felt would fit into the world of the film series. Corgan was also enthused to be involved with a major film franchise, seeing it as "an opportunity to contribute to a larger creative history." The song was recorded at Chaplin Studios, with additional recording taking place in Chicago. The band included "Black Stars" in the setlist for their tour dates following the song's release.

== Composition ==
"Black Stars" is a moody mid-tempo song with "a siren-like guitar line", vocal harmonies, and a half-time bridge, featuring jangly production and a gentle melody with "plenty of twinkle in its crunch." Several critics compared it to the band's college rock music from the 1990s, particularly their "dreamier" side.

== Critical reception ==
Rock Sound praised the song the song's nostalgic yet fresh feeling, calling it a "wonderful creation for a fascinating source."

== Music video ==
The music video for "Black Stars", directed by Gus Black, was released along with the song. It is a spare video, featuring performance shots mixed with clips of "a female character doing some sort of dance."

== Credits and personnel ==
All credits are adapted from Tidal.

- Billy Corgan – songwriter, vocals, bass, guitar, keyboards, recording engineer
- Butch Vig – producer
- Jimmy Chamberlin – drums
- James Iha – guitar
- Claire Acey – background vocals
- Sierra Swan – background vocals
- Andrew Scheps – mixing engineer
- Howie Weinberg – mastering engineer
- Will Boraz – mastering engineer
- Billy Bush – recording engineer
- Ongen Dinevski – recording, second engineer
- Nikola Dokic – additional engineering

== Charts ==
Chart performance for "Black Stars"
Chart (2026)	Peak position
Canada Rock (Billboard)	23
Italy Airplay (FIMI)	70
Italy Rock Airplay (FIMI)	2
US Alternative Airplay (Billboard)	20
US Mainstream Rock Airplay (Billboard)	19
US Rock & Alternative Airplay (Billboard)	15
