= The Hunger Games: Sunrise on the Reaping (soundtrack) =

The Hunger Games: Sunrise on the Reaping (The Album)

Soundtrack album by various artists
- Released: November 13, 2026
- Length: 99:52
- Label: MCA
- Compiler: Dave Cobb

Singles from The Hunger Games: Sunrise on the Reaping
- 1. "Draw You Out" Released: October 2, 2026; 2. "Black Stars" Released: October 23, 2026

The Hunger Games: Sunrise on the Reaping (The Album) is the soundtrack album to the 2026 film, an adaptation of the 2025 novel Sunrise on the Reaping by Suzanne Collins. Executively produced by Dave Cobb and consisting of 29 tracks, it was released on November 13, 2026, via MCA, one week before the film's theatrical release. Lead single "Draw You Out" by Noah Kahan was released on October 2, 2026, while "Black Stars" by the Smashing Pumpkins, "Favor" by Gigi Perez, and "The Wheel" by Lizzy McAlpine were released in subsequent weeks.

== Background ==
On September 24, 2026, a press release announced that the soundtrack album would be released on November 13. The track listing contains songs featured in earlier films in the franchise, such as "Deep in the Meadow" from The Hunger Games (2012) and "The Old Therebefore" from The Hunger Games: The Ballad of Songbirds & Snakes (2023). It was also announced that "Draw You Out" by Noah Kahan would serve as the album's lead single, which was released on October 2, 2026. The single will be released on 7-inch vinyl as part of Record Store Day Black Friday 2026.

"Black Stars" by the Smashing Pumpkins was released on October 16, along with an accompanying music video. It was later released as a single on October 23. For the track, the band reunited with producer Butch Vig for the first time in 33 years. "Favor" by Gigi Perez was released on October 29. The full track listing was unveiled on November 2, with artists ranging from Americana to rock to pop. Lizzy McAlpine's "The Wheel" was released on November 6. Listening parties for the album took place on November 7 at record stores in six U.S. cities.

== Songs ==
Songs performed by cast members Whitney Peak, Mckenna Grace, and Jennifer Lawrence feature on the soundtrack. Lawrence performs a new version of "Deep in the Meadow", which was earlier featured on the soundtrack to The Hunger Games: Mockingjay – Part 2 (2015). In addition, the album includes live versions and remixes, including a live version of the Cure's "Alone", from their album Songs of a Lost World (2024).

== Critical reception ==
"Favor", "See It Coming", and "Half Alive" were included on a Rolling Stone list of the 15 best Hunger Games soundtrack songs.

== Track listing ==
The Hunger Games: Sunrise on the Reaping (The Album) track listing
No.	Title	Writer(s)	Producer(s)	Length
1.	"The Raven I" (Whitney Peak)	Edgar Allan Poe; Dave Cobb	Cobb	0:45
2.	"Ash and Snow" (Noah Cyrus)	Noah Cyrus; PJ Harding	Cobb	3:28
3.	"First in Line" (Stephen Wilson Jr.)	Stephen Wilson Jr.	Cobb	3:39
4.	"See It Coming" (Bella Kay)	Bella Kay; Alexis Kesselman	Idarose	3:50
5.	"The Wheel" (Lizzy McAlpine)	Lizzy McAlpine; Mason Stoops; Omar Akrouche	McAlpine; Stoops	3:07
6.	"The Raven II" (Whitney Peak)	Poe; Cobb	Cobb	0:21
7.	"Dove Song" (Sydney Rose)	Sydney Rose	Noah Levine	3:38
8.	"Here Then We're Gone" (Ella Langley)	Ella Langley; Aaron Ratiere; Ernest K. Smith	Cobb	4:06
9.	"Wrestle with God" (Madeline Edwards)	Madeline Edwards	Cobb	3:24
10.	"Ruthless" (arena mix; Kacey Musgraves)	Kacey Musgraves; Daniel Tashian; Ian Fitchuk	Musgraves; Tashian; Fitchuk	3:40
11.	"No Destination" (Billy Vincent)	Billy Vincent; Lori McKenna; Liz Rose; Sean Mullins	Cobb	4:06
12.	"The Raven III" (Whitney Peak)	Poe; Cobb	Cobb	1:02
13.	"Favor" (Gigi Perez)	Gigi Perez; Aidan Hobbs	Perez; Hobbs	5:35
14.	"But You Wanted More" (Hudson Freeman)	Hudson Freeman	Ephraim McFarland	4:45
15.	"Black Stars" (the Smashing Pumpkins)	William Patrick Corgan	Butch Vig	3:26
16.	"Half Alive" (Mckenna Grace)	Mckenna Grace; Lauren Isenberg; Jeff Hazin	Cobb	4:01
17.	"Doing the Best That I Can" (arena mix; Stevie Nicks)	Stevie Nicks	Rupert Hine	5:21
18.	"The Goose and the Common" (Whitney Peak)	Cobb	Cobb	0:34
19.	"Survive" (arena mix / Káryyn rework; Depeche Mode and Káryyn)	Dave Gahan; Martin L. Gore	Káryyn; James Ford; Luca Perry	3:37
20.	"Same Blood" (Emelie Trahan)	Emelie Trahan; Edgar Prage	Prage	3:17
21.	"May Brings Flowers" (Kashus Culpepper)	Kashus Culpepper; Lee Thomas Miller	Brian Elmquist	3:47
22.	"The Old Therebefore" (Scot Greenan)	Suzanne Collins; Cobb	Cobb	1:03
23.	"Can't Let You Go" (Carter Faith)	Carter Faith; Tofer Brown; Jessie Jo Dillon	Cobb; Brown	5:58
24.	"Old Money" (Tyler Childers)	Tyler Childers	Childers; Kenny Miles	3:14
25.	"Show Me Where the Ending Starts" (Madison Cunningham)	Madison Cunningham	Cobb	3:59
26.	"Deep in the Meadow" (Jennifer Lawrence)	Collins; T Bone Burnett; Simone Burnett	Cobb	1:30
27.	"Draw You Out" (Noah Kahan)	Noah Kahan; Aaron Dessner	Kahan; Dessner	4:15
28.	"Metal Birds" (Violet Grohl)	Violet Grohl; Justin Raisen; Lewis Pesacov; Brad Lauchert	Grohl; Raisen; Pesacov	3:41
29.	"Alone" (live in Berlin 2022; the Cure)	Robert Smith		6:43
Total length:				99:52

=== Notes ===
- Vinyl editions omit tracks 1, 12, 14, 18, 22, 24, and 26.

== Charts ==
Chart performance for The Hunger Games: Sunrise on the Reaping (The Album)
Chart (2026)	Peak position
Austrian Albums (Ö3 Austria)	64
Belgian Albums (Ultratop Flanders)	60
Belgian Albums (Ultratop Wallonia)	87
Dutch Albums (Album Top 100)	83
German Albums (Offizielle Top 100)	38
Irish Compilations (IRMA)	3
New Zealand Albums (RMNZ)	32
Norwegian Albums (VG-lista)	39
Swedish Physical Albums (Sverigetopplistan)	19
Swiss Albums (Schweizer Hitparade)	80
UK Compilation Albums (Official Charts)	4
UK Soundtrack Albums (Official Charts)	1

== See also ==
- The Hunger Games (franchise) § Music
