= Nightcrawler (soundtrack) =

Nightcrawler (Original Motion Picture Soundtrack)

Film score by James Newton Howard
- Released: October 17, 2014
- Recorded: 2014
- Studio: AIR Lyndhurst Hall, London
- Genre: Electronic; ambience; synth; orchestral
- Length: 51:04
- Label: Lakeshore Records
- Producer: James Newton Howard; Joseph Trapanese; Sven Faulconer

James Newton Howard chronology
Maleficent (2014)	Nightcrawler (2014)	The Hunger Games: Mockingjay – Part 1 (2014)

Nightcrawler (Original Motion Picture Soundtrack) is the score album to the 2014 film composed by James Newton Howard. The score consists of moody electronic and synth music in contrast to his large orchestral scores he had composed for big-budget films, that made his career. Per director Dan Gilroy's suggestions, Howard composed a subversive music that fits into the mind of the protagonist. The score consists of subtle electronic music throughout the film, whereas few orchestral sounds were created to underline the protagonist's character. The album was released by Lakeshore Records on October 17, 2014, while a vinyl edition was released in January 2016 by Invada Records.

== Development ==
James Newton Howard composed the film score. Instead of the large orchestral scores that previously defined his career, Howard composed edgy electronica pieces for the film, heavy influenced by 1980s synth music, similar to Cliff Martinez's score for Drive (2011). He initially struggled writing a score that fit both the overall atmosphere of the film and Gilroy's expectations. Instead of using what Consequence of Sound described as "the expected 10 strings and a nightmarish score", Gilroy wanted more uplifting and subversive music.

Howard's ideas about how to solve a situation with the music turned out to not be the way that he wanted to go, so he had to indoctrinate himself into what the movie was about. Gilroy's approach was to use the score as a way to get inside Lou's mind, which meant that the music that sometimes seemed discordant with the action on screen. He pointed that "It's a bit of a magic trick: As the music is creeping into your own head, it's creating this feeling of eagerness and climbing the ladder and succeeding and trying and not giving up, all while you're watching this maladjusted behavior get rewarded — it cements you to the character and his quest." He called it as a surreal effect romanticizing Lou's ambitions.

As an example, Howard cited a sequence when Lou moves a dead body to get a better angle, he played the score in a triumphant way instead of dark, as he wanted to see the scene from Lou's perception, which was meant to convey how he is excited about the shot. The cue becomes "an anthem of potential for his tremendous success". Howard worked mostly in the electronic music with bits of orchestral vocals, as he wanted to sync the music with the film's visuals, that were shot in Los Angeles. He played the electronics in a subtle way as "people would be less able to draw an emotional conclusion based on what they were hearing" but when it came to Lou, he composed an orchestral, clarinet-driven theme: “It had to do with Lou's lightness of touch. Because he moves through all of these situations so effortlessly and with a certain kind of intelligence, I thought orchestral music would best portray that."

== Release ==
The original score to Nightcrawler was released on October 17, 2014, by Lakeshore Records in digital and CD.

On May 6, 2015, Invada Records announced that they are distributing the vinyl edition of the soundtrack. In November, the details for the vinyl release was announced by Invada, where the soundtrack being pressed into a 425 gram heavyweight sleeve, full colour double sided inner, a digital download card, and illustrations by Ben Holmes with two variants: purple with yellow splatter, cherry coke, grey with yellow splatter and mellow yellow discs. The album was released on January 29, 2016.

== Track listing ==
No.	Title	Length
1.	"Nightcrawler"	1:58
2.	"Lou's Inspired"	2:10
3.	"Driving at Night"	0:53
4.	"Sell the Bike"	1:02
5.	"Loder Crashes"	2:32
6.	"KWLA"	1:27
7.	"The First Accident"	1:49
8.	"Day to Night"	0:43
9.	"Pictures on the Fridge"	1:42
10.	"The First Night"	1:37
11.	"Entering the House"	3:02
12.	"Edit on the Hood"	1:07
13.	"Lou and Rick on a Roll"	2:08
14.	"Driving at Night, Again"	1:04
15.	"Waiting"	0:57
16.	"Mount Wilson"	1:38
17.	"The Wrong Way"	1:12
18.	"Watching the House Footage"	1:03
19.	"Lou's Philosophy"	1:53
20.	"Making the News"	0:49
21.	"Search for the Plate"	1:02
22.	"The Newscast"	3:44
23.	"Moving the Body"	1:52
24.	"Chinatown Express"	4:16
25.	"Nina and Frank"	1:01
26.	"The Shootout"	4:35
27.	"Lou's Free"	1:35
28.	"If It Bleeds It Leads"	2:13
Total length:		51:04

== Reception ==
The score received generally positive reviews from critics. Klein David of PopOptiq wrote "Howard's only writing half of his music for us. When tasked with a narrative that's part-satire, part-thriller, part-black comedy, part-psychological profile, Howard sounds like he's composing in the moment, improvising scene-by-scene. The end result makes about as much sense as scowling at the Max Weinberg 7." Ross Boyask of Blueprint Review commented "the Nightcrawler score grabs you immediately and then never lets up, creating an intense, moody atmosphere." Richard Corliss of Time mentioned on the score's influence from Bernard Herrmann's music for Taxi Driver (1976), which served as a touchstone for the composer. The Hollywood Reporter noted that the score recalls the hypnotic melodies he composed for Michael Mann's Collateral (2004). Kate Erbland of Film School Rejects wrote that the soundtrack "smacks of the appropriate eighties influence".

However Bridget R. Irvine in his review for The Harvard Crimson felt that "The musical score, by James Newton Howard, does not shine as brightly as the film's other components. At certain tense points in the beginning of the film, the music feels awkwardly optimistic, most likely intended to create sympathy for Lou. As the film progresses, however, the score improves—and the music for the climax parallels the tone of the narrative." In a contrasting review, James Southall of Movie Wave wrote "the James Newton Howard paradox is fully in evidence throughout Nightcrawler, as it veers between some moments that are dramatically and musically compelling, some that have some real dramatic purpose and a degree of style though not the greatest things to hear out of context, and others that seem entirely uninspired. There isn't nearly enough of the former to prompt me to recommend the album, which is not entirely without interest but doesn't offer nearly enough, consistently enough." James Newton Howard won Best Score at the San Diego Film Critics Society Awards 2014.

== Credits ==
Credits adapted from CD liner notes.

- Music – James Newton Howard
- Additional music – Sunna Wehrmeijer, Sven Faulconer
- Score producer – Joseph Trapanese
- Soundtrack producer – Sven Faulconer
- Recording – Ross Hogarth
- Score mixing – Matt Ward
- Mixing assistant – Carl Schroeder
- Mastering – Dave Donnelly
- Music editor – Nic Ratner
- Music supervisors – Brian Ross, Nic Ratner
- Score co-ordinator – Pamela Sollie
- Scoring crew – Laurence Anslow, Tom Bailey
- Music preparation – Joann Kane Music Service, Mark Graham
- Music librarian – Dave Hage
- Executive producer – Brian McNelis, Skip Williamson
- Synth programming – Christopher Wray
- Auricle control systems – Andy Glen, Richard Grant
- Art direction, design – John Bergin

Soloists

- Drums – John Robinson
- Electric bass – Neil Stubenhaus
- Guitar – Christopher Wray, Michael Landau
- Percussion – Lenny Castro

Philharmonia Orchestra

- Orchestration – Pete Anthony, William Stromberg
- Orchestra conductor – Allan Wilson
- Orchestra contractor – Paul Talkington
- Recording – Haydn Bendall

Featured instrumentalists

- Bass – Christian Geldsetzer, Gareth Sheppard, Neil Tarlton
- Cello – Anne Baker, Ashok Klouda, Deirdre Cooper, Desmond Neysmith, Ella Rundle, Karen Stephenson, Timothy Walden, Victoria Simonsen
- Clarinet – Mark Van De Wiel
- Viola – Cheremie Hamilton-Miller, Ellen Blythe, Fiona Dalgliesh, Graeme McKean, Linda Kidwell, Louise Hawker, Nicole Bootiman, Rebecca Carrington, Rebecca Wade, Samuel Burstin
- Violin – Adrián Varela, Eleanor Wilkinson, Gideon Robinson, Helen Cochrane, Imogen East, Jan Regulski, Karin Tilch, Laura Dixon, Lulu Fuller, Nathaniel Anderson-Frank, Nicole Wilson, Paula Clifton-Everest, Samantha Reagan, Soong Choo, Susan Bowran, Susan Hedger, Victoria Irish, Zsolt-Tihamér Visontay
