= Maleficent (soundtrack) =

Maleficent (Original Motion Picture Soundtrack)

Film score by James Newton Howard
- Released: May 26, 2014
- Recorded: 2012–2014
- Studio: Abbey Road Studios, London
- Genre: Classical; orchestral
- Length: 1:11:46
- Label: Walt Disney
- Producer: James Newton Howard

James Newton Howard chronology
Cut Bank (2014)	Maleficent (2014)	Nightcrawler (2014)

Maleficent (Original Motion Picture Soundtrack) is the score album composed by James Newton Howard for the 2014 film Maleficent, based on the Disney villain character Maleficent from the animated film Sleeping Beauty (1959). The film is a live-action spin-off of Sleeping Beauty, and is loosely inspired from Charles Perrault's original fairy tale. Directed by Robert Stromberg, the film stars Angelina Jolie in the titular character.

The film marked Howard's first live-action film from Disney, as he previously scored for the Disney animation films Dinosaur (2000), Atlantis: The Lost Empire (2001) and Treasure Planet (2002). The score album was released by Walt Disney Records on May 26, 2014. It includes 22 tracks from Howard's score, and a cover version of the song "Once Upon a Dream" performed by Lana Del Rey. The track was earlier released as a single on January 26, 2014, to coincide the 56th Annual Grammy Awards, and also released for free digital download on Google Play. The score received positive reviews from critics.

== Background ==
James Newton Howard was announced to compose the film score in October 2012. Robert Stromberg had added that he wanted him to score for the film, in the very first place and had tracked the pre-visuals of the director's cut with his music from other films. When Howard was officially on board, Stromberg felt that "he emotionally heightened the Maleficent with what felt like a classic film score". The recording was held at the Abbey Road Studios in London.

Apart from Howard's score, the album also featured a cover version of the track "Once Upon a Dream" performed by Lana Del Rey. The track is originally composed by Pyotr Ilyich Tchaikovsky and written by Jack Lawrence and Sammy Fain from the 1959 film Sleeping Beauty, and features as the title song for Maleficent. Del Rey performed the cover version of the track on stage at the 56th Annual Grammy Awards on January 26, 2014, where the song was also released for free digital download during its first week of availability by the Google Play Store, and by February 4, the song was made available for purchase.

Walt Disney Records released the film's soundtrack on May 26, 2014, featuring 23 tracks. Recalling in a 2016 interview to Phillip Valys of Sun-Sentinel, Howard called Maleficent as one of his favourite films he had scored for. He performed the orchestral score live at the Adrienne Arsht Center for the Performing Arts in Miami, Florida, on February 19, 2016, along with the other orchestral film scores, including The Dark Knight and The Hunger Games film series.

== Reception ==
The score received positive critical response. Jonathan Broxton wrote in his review, stating "Stylistically, you can look to scores like Waterworld, King Kong, Lady in the Water and The Last Airbender for comparisons, but Maleficent is still has a sense of individual flair, and is distinct enough to stand on its own." James Southall of Movie Wave wrote "Maleficent is big and bold, featuring memorable themes and emotional development. There isn't a hint of the malaise which seems to have overcome its composer in recent years and it is a truly impressive return to form, easily his finest score since Lady in the Water and perhaps even further back than that." Mfiles.com wrote "an enjoyably old-fashioned film score experience, one perhaps lacking a defining identity, but a beautiful return to form for the composer nonetheless".

Sheri Linden of The Hollywood Reporter wrote "the swell and bombast of James Newton Howard's score comes on strong in the early sequences before finding a groove". Mark Hughes was more critical about the film in his review for Forbes, but praised Howard's score. Heather Phares of Allmusic called the score as "foreboding yet witty" and praised Del Rey's cover of "Once Upon a Dream" calling it as "eerie and alluring" and added that it "... serves as a reminder as to why she's become one of the most in-demand soundtrack contributors of the 2010s".

Andrew Barker of Variety wrote "James Newton Howard's sweeping score locates a nice sweet spot somewhere between Erich Korngold and Danny Elfman, and Lana Del Rey's gothy take on the "Sleeping Beauty" showstopper "Once Upon a Dream" makes for a fitting closer". Michael Phillips of Chicago Tribune, in a mixed review, called the score as "sloshy and pushy". Filmtracks.com wrote " Perhaps the most brilliant move that Howard made with this score was one that many listeners won't even notice, and that's because it's an intentional absence of theme that is key to the plot. Howard seemingly intended not to provide him with a theme, instead content to write meaninglessly fluffy underscore for his scenes [...] There are few downsides to the soundtrack for Maleficent on the whole. One of them is Howard's seeming inability to really clarify his themes with the obvious delineation you typically hear in massive fantasy scores. In other words, some listeners will have difficulty placing the themes and instead content themselves by soaking in the whole. It is not as taut a thematic narrative as Lady in the Water, but few scores will be. Still, you rarely find fantasy scores of this caliber in the 2010's [sic], such spectacular orchestral majesty a truly rare commodity."

== Track listing ==
All music is composed by James Newton Howard, except where noted.

Maleficent (Original Motion Picture Soundtrack)
No.	Title	Length
1.	"Maleficent Suite"	6:38
2.	"Welcome to the Moors"	1:05
3.	"Maleficent Flies"	4:39
4.	"Battle of the Moors"	4:58
5.	"Three Peasant Women"	1:04
6.	"Go Away"	2:26
7.	"Aurora and the Fawn"	2:28
8.	"The Christening"	5:30
9.	"Prince Philip"	2:29
10.	"The Spindle's Power"	4:35
11.	"You Could Live Here Now"	2:26
12.	"Path of Destruction"	1:47
13.	"Aurora in Faerieland"	4:41
14.	"The Wall Defends Itself"	1:06
15.	"The Curse Won't Reverse"	1:21
16.	"Are You Maleficent?"	2:10
17.	"The Army Dances"	1:28
18.	"Phillip's Kiss"	2:20
19.	"The Iron Gauntlet"	1:35
20.	"True Love's Kiss"	2:33
21.	"Maleficent Is Captured"	7:42
22.	"The Queen of Faerieland"	3:25
23.	"Once Upon a Dream" (Lana Del Rey)	3:20
Total length:		1:11:46

Japan bonus track
No.	Title	Length
1.	"Once Upon A Dream" (Shinobu Otake)	3:23
Total length:		1:15:09

== Personnel ==
Credits adapted from CD liner notes:

- Music composed and produced by – James Newton Howard
- Music arrangements – Sunna Wehrmeijer, Sven Faulconer
- Music programming – Christopher Wray
- Recorded by – Shawn Murphy
- Mixed by – Erik Swanson, Shawn Murphy
- Mastered by – Dave Collins
- Music editor – David Olson, Jim Weidman, Thomas Drescher,
- Score editor – David Channing
- Sound engineer – Matt Ward
- Score recordist – Lewis Jones
- Score co-ordinator – Pamela Sollie
- Music preparation – Joann Kane Music Service
- Scoring crew – Adam Miller, Greg McAllister, John Prestage, Matt Mysko
- MIDI controller – Andy Glen, Chris Cozens, Richard Grant
- Music librarian – Mark Graham
- Music business affairs – Donna Cole-Brulé, Scott Holtzman
- Executive in charge of music – Mitchell Leib

London Symphony Orchestra

- Orchestration – Jeff Atmajian, John Ashton Thomas, Jon Kull, Marcus Trumpp, Peter Bateman
- Orchestra conductor – Pete Anthony
- Orchestra contractor – Isobel Griffiths, Jo Changer
- Orchestra leader – Thomas Bowes
- Instrumentation:
- Bass – Allen Walley, Andy Pask, Leon Bosch, Mary Scully, Paddy Lannigan, Paul Kimber, Roger Linley, Steve Williams*, Steve Mair
- Bassoon – Dominic Morgan, Rachel Simms, Richard Skinner, Stephen Maw
- Celesta – Dave Hartley
- Cello – Caroline Dearnley, Chris Worsey, Dave Daniels, Frank Schaefer, Ian Burdge, Joely Koos, Jonathan Williams, Martin Loveday, Nick Cooper, Paul Kegg, Tim Gill, Anthony Lewis, Tony Woollard, Josephine Knight
- Clarinet – Robert Plane, Anthony Pike, David Fuest
- Contrabass – Anthony Pike, David Fuest
- Fiddle – Sonia Slany
- Flute – Anna Noakes, Helen Keen, Karen Jones, Nina Robertson
- Harp – Camilla Pay, Helen Tunstall, Skaila Kanga
- Horn – Corinne Bailey, David Pyatt, John Thurgood, Laurence Davies, Martin Owen, Mike Thompson, Mike Kidd, Nick Korth, Nigel Black, Phillip Eastop, Richard Berry, Richard Watkins, Roger Montgomery
- Oboe – David Theodore, Jane Marshall, Leila Ward
- Percussion – Chris Baron, Frank Ricotti, Gary Kettel, Paul Clarvis, Sam Walton, Stephen Henderson, Bill Lockhart
- Piano – Simon Chamberlain
- Trombone – Andy Wood, Darren Smith, Dudley Bright, Edward Tarrant, Emma Hodgson, Mark Nightingale, Martin Kelly, Paul Milner, Peter Davies, Roger Argente
- Trumpet – Alistair Mackie, Kate Moore, Paul Mayes, Philip Cobb
- Tuba – Nick Hitchens, Owen Slade
- Viola – Andy Parker, Bob Smissen, Bruce White, Clair Finnimore, Edward Vanderspar, Fiona Bonds, Garfield Jackson, Helen Kamminga, Julia Knight, Martin Humbey, Max Baillee, Paul Cassidy, Peter Lale, Rachel Bolt, Rachel Roberts, Reiad Chibah, Steve Wright, Vicci Wardman
- Violin – Boguslaw Kostecki, Cathy Thompson, Chris Tombling, Debbie Preece, Debbie Widdup, Emlyn Singleton, Everton Nelson, Gaby Lester, Ian Humphries, Jackie Hartley, John Bradbury, Jonathan Evans-Jones, Jonathan Rees, Julian Leaper, Kathy Gowers, Lorraine McAslan, Maciej Rakowski, Mark Berrow, Martin Burgess, Natalia Bonner, Patrick Kiernan, Paul Willey, Perry Montague-Mason, Philippa Ibbotson, Philippe Honoré, Ralph De Souza, Rita Manning, Roger Garland, Steve Morris, Tom Pigott-Smith, Warren Zelinski, Sonia Slany, Thomas Bowes

London Voices

- Chorus master – Nigel Short
- Alto vocals – Alexandra Gibson, Claire Henry, Clara Sanabras, Clememtine Franks, Deryn Edwards, Freya Jacklin, Helen Brooks, Judith Rees, Martha McLorinan
- Bass vocals – Adrian Peacock, Benjamin Bevan, Lawrence Wallington, Mark Williams, Michael Dore, Neil Bellingham, Nicholas Ashby, Nicholas Garrett
- Soprano vocals – Alison Hill, Ann De Renais, Cheryl Enever, Grace Davidson, Ildiko Allen, Jacqueline Barron, Joanna Forbes Lestrange, Juliet Schiemann, Kate Ashby, Kate Trethewey, Philippa Murray, Ruth Kerr
- Tenor vocals – Benedict Hymas, Gareth Morris, Harvey Brough, Henry Moss, Norbert Meyn, Peter Wilman, Philip Sheffield, Richard Edgar Wilson, Richard Eteson, Simon Haynes

Trinity Boys Choir

- Chorus master – Ben Parry, David Swinson
- Solo vocalists – Benedict Hill, William Gardner

== Charts ==
Chart (2014)	Peak position
UK Soundtrack Albums (OCC)	42
US Billboard 200	123
US Soundtrack Albums (Billboard)	18

== Release history ==
Region	Date	Catalog Code	Ref.
United States	May 26, 2014	D001908702	
Europe	May 26, 2014	050087296001	
Canada	May 26, 2014	D001908702	
Japan	July 2, 2014	AVCW-63031	
Malaysia	August 4, 2014	050087296001	
South Korea	December 3, 2014	DY31070	
Taiwan	December 10, 2014	050087296001	

== Accolades ==
Award	Category	Recipients	Result
Hollywood Music in Media Awards	Best Original Score – Sci-Fi/Fantasy	James Newton Howard	Nominated
International Film Music Critics Association	Film Score of the Year	James Newton Howard	Nominated
International Film Music Critics Association	Best Original Score for a Fantasy/Science Fiction/Horror Film	James Newton Howard	Won
International Film Music Critics Association	Film Music Composition of the Year	James Newton Howard – "Maleficent Flies"	Nominated
International Film Music Critics Association	Film Music Composition of the Year	James Newton Howard – "Maleficent Suite"	Nominated
