= Draw You Out =

Single by Noah Kahan

from the album The Hunger Games: Sunrise on the Reaping (The Album)
- Released: October 2, 2026
- Length: 4:15
- Label: Mercury
- Songwriters: Noah Kahan; Aaron Dessner
- Producers: Noah Kahan; Aaron Dessner

Noah Kahan singles chronology
"Orbiter" (2026)	"Draw You Out" (2026)

The Hunger Games singles chronology
"Can't Catch Me Now" (2023)	"Draw You Out" (2026)	"Black Stars" (2026)

Music video
- "Draw You Out" on YouTube

"Draw You Out" is a song by American singer-songwriter Noah Kahan. It was released on October 2, 2026, as the lead single from the soundtrack of the upcoming film The Hunger Games: Sunrise on the Reaping.

== Background ==
Noah Kahan is a fan of The Hunger Games franchise and said he has always wanted to write a song for a movie in the series. He said the process of composing the song required a lot of research. He wanted to find similarities between himself and the film's main character, Haymitch Abernathy, so he could write a song that would fit the character while still reflecting his own personality and emotions.

== Composition ==
The song is driven by a guitar instrumental, with lyrics about finding hope, purpose and perseverance through times of grief. Kahan sings from the perspective of Haymitch Abernathy, who is mourning the death of Lenore Dove.

== Charts ==
Chart performance for "Draw You Out"
Chart (2026)	Peak position
Australia (ARIA)	35
Canada Hot 100 (Billboard)	14
Global 200 (Billboard)	40
Ireland (IRMA)	9
Latvia Airplay (LaIPA)	16
Netherlands (Single Tip)	11
New Zealand (Recorded Music NZ)	15
Norway (VG-lista)	91
Sweden Heatseeker (Sverigetopplistan)	1
UK Singles (Official Charts)	16
US Billboard Hot 100	25
US Hot Rock & Alternative Songs (Billboard)	4
