= Water for Elephants (soundtrack) =

2011 film soundtrack album

Water for Elephants (Original Motion Picture Soundtrack)

Film score by James Newton Howard
- Released: April 19, 2011
- Recorded: 2010–2011
- Studio: Sony Scoring Stage, Sony Pictures Studios, Culver City, California
- Genre: Film score
- Length: 60:18
- Label: Sony Classical
- Producer: James Newton Howard; Stuart Michael Thomas; Jim Weidman

James Newton Howard chronology
Gnomeo & Juliet (2011)	Water for Elephants (2011)	Green Lantern (2011)

Water for Elephants (Original Motion Picture Soundtrack) is the film score composed by James Newton Howard to the 2011 film Water for Elephants directed by Francis Lawrence based on the 2006 novel by Sara Gruen and starred Robert Pattinson, Reese Witherspoon and Christoph Waltz. The album featured Howard's score and three classical songs from the early 20th century, and was released through Sony Classical Records on April 19, 2011.

== Background ==
Water for Elephants marked the second collaboration between Howard and Lawrence following I Am Legend (2007). At a live performance conducted by the Dallas Symphony Orchestra, Howard said that he was "proud" of the score adding that he had embodied a brand of cinematic magic but his score for this particular film brough the work to a whole new level as he fully captured the intangible wonderment and mystique which existed in all of John Williams scores, adding that it was "fun to write circus music". The original score album was released through Sony Classical Records on April 19, 2011.

== Reception ==
Jonathan Broxton of Movie Music UK wrote "Whatever shortcomings Water for Elephants may have as a film – and judging by the reviews it has quite a few – James Newton Howard's score is not one of them. Fans of intimate romance and gentle emotion will find it to be an engaging listen from start to finish, with pretty themes and beguiling orchestrations that are tempered with a few moments of liveliness and a few moments of darkness to balance things out. In a year which has – with the exception of [Dario] Marianelli's Jane Eyre – proved to be remarkably bereft of serious romantic works, Water for Elephants sits proudly at the top end of a short list as one of the best of its kind in 2011 to date."

Filmtracks wrote "With so many small oddities involving Water for Elephants, including the endless stream of connections to other composers, it has been difficult to determine if the hour-long album for the soundtrack should receive three or four stars. The songs fade in and out of the score with ease, though the changes in key aren't always smooth. Still, it's great to hear vintage Horner and Newman music, even in small doses, and for that likely unintended outcome by Howard, the album has to be cautiously recommended." James Christopher Monger of AllMusic wrote "Largely orchestral with flourishes of mandolin and guitar, jazz, cabaret, and vaudeville blues, Howard’s lovely and lucid score draws from the realms of fantasy, magical realism, and historical fiction while maintaining a concrete sense of place."

Sean Wilson of MFiles wrote "James Newton Howard has always excelled at tender romance and Water for Elephants does little to refute the claim. It's a beguiling and hugely attractive effort, blending soothing melodies and darker sections in one smoothly melodious package. Undoubtedly one of the best scores of 2011." Richard Corliss of Time wrote "James Newton Howard wrote Elephants' sumptuous score." Peter Debruge of Variety wrote that Howard's "rich orchestral score sadly lacks a clear theme". Stephen Holden of The New York Times considered it to be an "insufferable wall-to-wall musical soup." The Santa Barbara Independent-based critic wrote "Composer James Newton Howard's mawkishly generic Hollywood fairy-dust score doesn't help". Brad Brevet of Comingsoon.net considered the score to be "James Newton Howard's best imitation of Alexandre Desplat".

== Track listing ==
No.	Title	Performer(s)	Length
1.	"Did I Miss It?"		1:53
2.	"The Circus Sets Up"		2:32
3.	"Circus Fantasy"		3:44
4.	"Jacob Sees Marlena"		5:00
5.	"Button Up Your Overcoat" (excerpt)	Ruth Etting	0:32
6.	"Prosze, Rosie, daj noge"		4:12
7.	"Rosie"		3:24
8.	"Speakeasy Kiss"		1:33
9.	"I'm Confessin' (That I Love You)"		1:40
10.	"Barabra's Tent"		1:18
11.	"Jacob Returns"		5:30
12.	"Don't Tell Him What Happened to Me"		2:03
13.	"Shooting Star"		2:25
14.	"The Job Is Yours"		0:57
15.	"Need a Little Sugar in My Bowl"	Bessie Smith	2:47
16.	"Stomp Time Blues"	Jasper Taylor and His State Street Boys	2:34
17.	"I Can See Straight Through You"		6:00
18.	"Sanctuary"		1:55
19.	"Baptism / Jacob & Rosie"		1:58
20.	"The Stampede / I'm Coming Home"		8:21
Total length:			60:18

== Personnel ==
Credits adapted from liner notes:

- Music composer – James Newton Howard
- Music producer – James Newton Howard, Jim Weidman
- Score producer – Stuart Michael Thomas
- Arrangements – Dan Higgins
- Recording – Shawn Murphy, Matt Ward
- Recordist – Adam Michalak, Steve Genewick
- Mixing – Shawn Murphy
- Supervising music editor – Jim Weidman
- Music editor – David Olson
- Music supervisor – Alexandra Patsavas
- Auricle control systems – Richard Grant
- Pro-tools operator – Erik Swanson, Larry Mah
- Music consultant – Charles P. Conrad
- Technical score advisor – Sven Faulconer
- Scoring crew – David Marquette, Greg Loskorn, Mark Eshelman
- Music coordinator – Pamela Sollie
- Music preparation – JoAnn Kane Music Service
- Copyist – Mark Graham
- Music clearance – Ellen Ginsburg, Summer Stone
- Music business and legal affairs (20th Century Fox) – Tom Cavanaugh
- Executive in charge of music (20th Century Fox) – Robert Kraft
- Production supervisor (20th Century Fox) – Amy Driscoll, Rebecca Morellato

Orchestra

- Orchestrators – Conrad Pope, Jeff Atmajian, Jon Kull, Pete Anthony
- Conductor – Pete Anthony
- Contractor – Peter Rotter, Sandy DeCrescent
- Leader – Roger Wilkie

Instruments

- Acoustic guitar, dulcimer, cuatro – George Doering
- Alto saxophone – Dan Higgins
- Bass – Bruce Morgenthaler, Chris Kollgaard, Drew Dembowski, Edward Meares, Mike Valerio, Nico Abondolo, Oscar Hidalgo
- Bassoon – Kenneth Munday, Michael O'Donovan
- Cello – Andrew Shulman, Tony Cooke, Armen Ksajikian, Cecilia Tsan, Tina Soule, David Speltz, Dennis Karmazyn, Erika Duke, Kim Scholes, John Walz, Paula Hochhalter, Steve Erdody, Tim Landauer, Trevor Handy
- Clarinet – Benjamin Lulich, Dan Higgins, Stuart Clark
- Cornet – Jon Lewis, Malcolm McNab, Tim Morrison, Warren Luening
- Flute – Geraldine Rotella, Greg Huckins, Heather Clark, Stephen Jujala
- Guitar – Jim Fox
- Harp – Gayle Levant, Marcia Dickstein
- Horn – Brian O'Connor, Daniel Kelley, David Everson, James Thatcher, Steve Becknell
- Oboe – Barbara Northcutt, Tom Boyd
- Percussion – Alan Estes, Bob Zimmitti, Dan Greco, Peter Limonick
- Piano – Jim Cox, Randy Kerber
- Tenor saxophone – Bill Liston
- Trombone – Alex Iles, Andy Malloy, Bill Reichenbach, Bill Booth
- Trumpet – Jon Lewis, Malcolm McNab, Warren Luening
- Tuba – Doug Tornquist, Jim Self, Joe Langer
- Viola – Andrew Duckles, Brian Dembow, Darrin McCann, David Walther, Keith Greene, Marlow Fisher, Matthew Funes, Mike Nowak, Pam Jacobsen, Rob Brophy, Roland Kato, Shawn Mann, Steven Gordon, Thomas Diener, Vickie Miskolczy
- Violin – Alyssa Park, Belinda Broughton, Bruce Dukov, Darius Campo, Dimitrie Leivici, Elizabeth Johnson, Endre Granat, Eun Mee Ahn, Haim Shtrum, Jackie Brand, Jay Rosen, Jeanne Skrocki, Jessica Guideri, Josefina Vergara, Julie Ann Gigante, Katia Popov, Kevin Connolly, Lisa Sutton, Marc Sazer, Miwako Watanabe, Natalie Leggett, Nina Evtuhov, Phillip Levy, Rafael Rishik, Roberto Cani, Roger Wilkie, Sara Parkins, Sarah Thornblade, Searmi Park, Serena McKinney, Tammy Hatwan, Tereza Stanislav

== Accolades ==
Awards	Date of ceremony	Category	Recipient(s)	Result	Ref.
Guild of Music Supervisors Awards	February 12, 2012	Best Music Supervision for Films Budgeted Over $25 Million	Alexandra Patsavas (Note: also for The Twilight Saga: Breaking Dawn – Part 1, A Better Life, The Dilemma and The Beaver)	Nominated	
Satellite Awards	December 18, 2011	Best Original Score	James Newton Howard	Nominated	
