= The Hunger Games (score) =

The Hunger Games (Original Motion Picture Score)

Film score by James Newton Howard
- Released: March 26, 2012
- Recorded: 2011–2012
- Venues: AIR Studios, London
- Genre: Film score
- Length: 42:16
- Label: Universal Republic
- Producers: James Newton Howard; T-Bone Burnett; Jim Weidman; Stuart Michael Thomas

James Newton Howard film score chronology
Green Lantern (2011)	The Hunger Games (2012)	Snow White & the Huntsman (2012)

The Hunger Games (Original Motion Picture Score) is the score album to the 2012 film The Hunger Games. The score was initially intended to be composed by Danny Elfman in his collaboration with T Bone Burnett, however, James Newton Howard replaced Elfman as the composer. It was released by Universal Republic Records on March 26, 2012.

== Development ==
In June 2011, Lionsgate originally announced that Danny Elfman and T-Bone Burnett would score The Hunger Games, with Burnett also acting as the film's executive music producer to produce songs for the soundtrack. Due to scheduling conflicts, Elfman was replaced by James Newton Howard.

Arcade Fire also contributed to the movie's original score. The group composed the fascistic-inspired Panem national anthem, entitled "Horn of Plenty", a leitmotif appearing throughout the film. "We were interested in making music that would be more integral in the movie, just as a mental exercise," Butler, who co-wrote the song with Chassagne, explained. "And there's an anthem that runs throughout the books, the national anthem of the fascist Capitol. So as a thought experiment, we tried to write what that might sound like. It's like the Capitol's idea of itself, basically." He further added that "it's not a pop song or anything. More of an anthem that could be playing at a big sporting event like the [Hunger] Games. So we did a structure for that, and then James Newton Howard made a movie-score version of it that happens in several places in the film." According to Spin, "'Horn of Plenty' pulls off the neat feat of sounding both exactly like Arcade Fire and exactly like a futuristic anthem. It still has one foot in the band's uncorrupted neighborhoods, but another is up on the podium at the end of Star Wars accepting an Olympic gold medal or something. Horns blare, a choir booms, strings swell, the martial percussion steals the show, and we just realized how much we love Big Brother."

The film also features an obscure analog track from the 1970s, titled "Sediment", composed by Laurie Spiegel for its "cornucopia scene", as well as music by Steve Reich, Ólafur Arnalds, and the Hypnotic Brass Ensemble. These do not appear on the soundtrack or score releases.

== Track listing ==
No.	Title	Length
1.	"The Hunger Games"	1:10
2.	"Katniss Afoot"	1:49
3.	"Reaping Day"	1:35
4.	"The Train"	1:27
5.	"Entering the Capitol"	2:28
6.	"Preparing the Chariots"	1:05
7.	"Horn of Plenty"	1:59
8.	"Penthouse/Training"	3:36
9.	"Learning the Skills"	1:41
10.	"The Countdown"	1:58
11.	"Booby Trap"	2:37
12.	"Healing Katniss"	3:04
13.	"Rue's Farewell"	5:00
14.	"We Could Go Home"	1:15
15.	"Searching for Peeta"	1:27
16.	"The Cave"	3:13
17.	"Muttations"	4:45
18.	"Tenuous Winners/Returning Home"	3:25
Total length:		42:16

== Reception ==
Filmtracks.com wrote, "Like most decent Howard scores, there are individual moments of melodrama or intriguing percussion employment that will merit repeat attention. As a whole, however, don't be surprised if you find a large number of non-concept enthusiasts writing The Hunger Games off as a disappointment. Regardless of where you exist in this spectrum of opinion, it's difficult not to ponder what Elfman would have conjured for this franchise." Heather Phares of AllMusic gave four out of five stars, saying, "Newton's score is one more fine piece of The Hunger Games experience, even if it's not the showiest one". Brad Kamminga of Film Score Reviews rated three stars out of five, calling it, "a very simple and subtle score that connects you very personally to the main character, Katniss. The use of ethnic instruments throughout the score instill in you the feeling of being in a foreign place."

Sean Wilson of MFiles wrote, "The Hunger Games is a score that will likely confound many expectations [...] Howard's subtlety and restraint might come as a shock. It's certainly not the bombastic, in your face, action-laden score many people will have expected but that's entirely to its credit. In truth, an overbearing score would likely have proved detrimental to director Gary Ross' vision, and Howard deserves much praise for imbuing his largely quiet score with just enough emotion and instrumental textures to keep it interesting." James Southall of Movie Wave wrote, "The Hunger Games is very impressive, featuring some real creativity and most importantly some fine music – you have to experience it on album rather than in the film to realise that, which is a bit of a pity, but on its own terms this is probably the finest collection of music from this composer since 1999’s Snow Falling on Cedars."

David Edelstein of Vulture said that Howard's score, "manages to be at once thrilling and plaintive". Natalie Zutter of Tor.com wrote, "James Newton Howard’s score evokes the space opera with its simple strains, soaring against the bleakness of District 12 and almost brittle as they clashes with the Capitol, a city so shiny it almost hurts to look at." Keertana Sastry of Business Insider wrote, "From the beautifully ominous humming in the opening scenes to the triumphant sounds of the Capitol, the score by James Newton Howard was hands down one of the biggest pluses of the movie. The best pieces from the score would have to the be in the scenes where Katniss is hunting or searching for Peeta as well as the scene where Katniss shoots an arrow at the Gamekeeper during her practice before the games." R. Kurt Osenlund of Slant Magazine wrote, "the score by T-Bone Burnett and James Newton Howard, which nicely steps in for the bloodcurdling screams of dying teens perhaps too terrible for the target YA audience."

== Credits ==
Credits adapted from CD liner notes:

- Pete Anthony – orchestration
- Jeff Atmajian – orchestration
- Simon Baggs – violin
- John Barclay – trumpet
- Nick Barr – viola
- Mark Berrow – violin
- Richard Berry – horn
- Nigel Black – horn
- Rachel Bolt – viola
- Natalia Bonner – violin
- Leon Bosch – bass
- Thomas Bowes – concert master, violin
- Dudley Bright – trombone
- Robin Brightman – violin
- Chris Brown – supervisor
- Jo Buckley – assistant contractor
- T-Bone Burnett – composer, executive producer
- Win Butler – composer
- Simon Chamberlain – piano
- David Channing – pro-tools
- Régine Chassagne – composer
- Reiad Chibah – viola
- Nick Cooper – celli
- Chris Cozens – auricle programming
- Caroline Dale – celli
- David Daniels – celli
- Philip D'Arcy – viola
- Laurence Davies – horn
- Caroline Dearnley – celli
- Alison Dods – violin
- Liz Edwards – violin
- Richard Edwards – trombone
- Terry Edwards – choir director
- Dai Emmanuel – violin
- Jonathan Evans-Jones – violin
- Sven Faulconer – arranger, synthesizer programming
- Clare Finnimore – viola
- Patricia Sullivan Fourstar – mastering
- Roger Garland – violin
- Tom Gould – violin
- Katherine Gowers – violin
- Richard Grant – auricle programming
- Timothy Grant – viola
- Gavin Greenaway – choir conductor, orchestra conductor
- Isobel Griffiths – orchestra contractor
- David Hage – music preparation
- Jordan Hale – intern
- Peter Hanson – violin
- Bill Hawkes – viola
- Jan Hendrickse – flute, recorder
- James Newton Howard – arranger, composer, producer, score producer
- Martin Humby – viola
- Ian Humphries – violin
- Philippa Ibbotson – violin
- Garfield Jackson – viola
- Magnus Johnston – violin
- Paul Kegg – celli
- Gary Kettel – percussion
- Josephine Knight – celli, cello
- Greg Knowles – cimbalom, dulcimer
- Joely Koos – celli
- Boguslav Kostecki – violin
- Paul Kowert – additional music
- Jon Kull – orchestration
- Nicollette Kuo – violin
- Paddy Lannigan – bass
- Chris Laurence – bass
- Tony Lewis – celli
- Roger Linley – bass
- William Lockhart – percussion
- Doug Logan – music librarian
- London Voices – choir
- Dorina Markoff – violin
- Paul Mayes – trumpet
- Lorraine McAslan – violin
- Tracy McKnight – executive in charge of music
- James McLeod – violin
- Steve McManus – bass
- Donald McVay – viola
- Adam Miller – assistant engineer
- Kate Moore – trumpet
- Shawn Murphy – engineer, score mixer
- Kate Musker – viola
- Everton Nelson – violin
- David Olson – music editor
- Steven Orton – celli
- Martin Owen – horn
- Tim Palen – photography
- Andrew Parker – viola
- John Parricelli – guitar (acoustic)
- Ben Parry – choir director
- Mike Piersante – mixing
- Tom Pigott-Smith – violin
- Debbie Preece – violin
- John Prestage – assistant engineer
- Richard Pryce – bass
- Jonathan Rees – violin
- Melissa Reiner – violin
- Frank Ricotti – percussion
- George Robertson – viola
- Gary Ross – liner notes
- Steve Rossell – bass
- Curtis Roush – music editor
- Clara Sanabras – Vocals
- Frank Schaefer – celli
- Karen Sidlow – administration
- Emlyn Singleton – violin
- Sonia Slany – fiddle
- Pamela Sollie – score co-ordinator
- David Stewart – trombone
- Jonathan Strange – violin
- Erik Swanson – pro-tools
- Julian Tear – violin
- Stephen Tees – viola
- David Theodore – cor anglais, oboe
- Chris Thile – additional music
- Stuart Michael Thomas – arranger, producer, synthesizer programming
- Cathy Thompson – violin
- Michael Thompson – horn
- Jon Thorne – viola
- John Thurgood – horn
- Jonathan Tunnell – celli
- Helen Tunstall – harp
- Matt Ward – assistant engineer
- Vicci Wardman – viola
- Jim Weidman – editing, music editor, producer
- Deborah Widdup – violin
- Katie Wilkinson Khoroshunin – viola
- Paul Willey – violin
- Jonathan Williams – celli
- Stephen Williams – bass
- Rolf Wilson – violin
- Gabe Witcher – additional music
- Lenny Wohl – executive vice president, general manager
- Andy Wood – trombone
- Jason Wormer – engineer
- Chris Worsey – celli
- Christopher Wray – scoring assistant
- Steve Wright – viola
- Willa Yudell – film music coordinator
