= The Hunger Games: Sunrise on the Reaping =

2026 film by Francis Lawrence

- Theatrical release poster
- Directed by: Francis Lawrence
- Screenplay by: Billy Ray; Michael Lesslie
- Adaptation by: Suzanne Collins
- Based on: Sunrise on the Reaping by Suzanne Collins
- Produced by: Nina Jacobson; Brad Simpson; Francis Lawrence
- Starring: Joseph Zada; Jesse Plemons; Ralph Fiennes; Glenn Close; Kieran Culkin; Elle Fanning; Mckenna Grace; Maya Hawke; Whitney Peak; Kelvin Harrison Jr.; Ben Wang; Josh Hutcherson; Woody Harrelson; Jennifer Lawrence
- Cinematography: Jo Willems
- Edited by: Mark Yoshikawa
- Music by: James Newton Howard
- Production company: Color Force
- Distributed by: Lionsgate
- Release dates: October 28, 2026 (Westfield London); November 20, 2026 (United States)
- Running time: 158 minutes
- Country: United States
- Language: English
- Budget: $150 million
- Box office: $225 million

The Hunger Games: Sunrise on the Reaping is a 2026 American dystopian film produced and directed by Francis Lawrence from a screenplay by Billy Ray and Michael Lesslie. Based on the 2025 novel Sunrise on the Reaping by Suzanne Collins, it is the sixth installment in The Hunger Games film series, serving as the second prequel to The Hunger Games (2012) after The Hunger Games: The Ballad of Songbirds & Snakes (2023).

The film, divided into three parts as is the novel, "The Birthday", "The Rascal", and "The Poster", stars Joseph Zada as a young Haymitch Abernathy, alongside Jesse Plemons, Ralph Fiennes, Glenn Close, Kieran Culkin, Elle Fanning, Mckenna Grace, Maya Hawke, Whitney Peak, Kelvin Harrison Jr., and Ben Wang, with Josh Hutcherson, Woody Harrelson, and Jennifer Lawrence reprising their roles from the original series. Set 24 years before the events of the first film, the story follows Haymitch, a 16-year-old resident of District 12 who is forced to compete in the 50th Hunger Games, a special edition of the annual competition in which twice the usual number of tributes are selected.

Lionsgate announced the film adaptation in June 2024, alongside the announcement of Collins's novel, with Lawrence returning to direct. Zada and Peak were cast in April 2025, followed by further casting announcements over the following months. Principal photography began in July 2025 and concluded that November, with filming taking place in Spain and Germany.

The Hunger Games: Sunrise on the Reaping premiered in London on October 28, 2026, and was theatrically released in the United States by Lionsgate on November 20, 2026. The film received mixed reviews from critics, and has grossed $225 million worldwide with a budget of $150 million.

== Plot ==
Haymitch Abernathy lives in Panem's District 12 with his widowed mother and younger brother, Sid, who he helps support by assisting a bootlegger. Haymitch's girlfriend, Lenore Dove Baird, is a member of the Covey, a group of former nomad artists forced to live in District 12.

The reaping for the milestone 50th Hunger Games, dubbed the Second Quarter Quell, falls on Haymitch's sixteenth birthday. To mark the anniversary, each district must provide four tributes instead of two. Tribute Woodbine Chance flees District 12's reaping, but Peacekeepers kill him. In the continuing chaos, Haymitch protects Lenore Dove from the Peacekeepers, and is selected as Chance's replacement by tribute escort Drusilla Sickle and television director Plutarch Heavensbee. The other District 12 tributes are Wyatt Callow, the oddsmaker for his bookie family, Haymitch’s neighbor Louella McCoy, and Maysilee Donner, who runs a family sweetshop with her identical twin Merrilee in the merchant district.

During the tribute parade in the Capitol, a chariot accident kills Louella. Haymitch mockingly applauds President Snow while standing over Louella's body. He is later summoned to Heavensbee's family estate, where Snow threatens him and his family. To conceal the death, Snow replaces Louella with a body double, who the District 12 tributes nickname "Lou Lou".

With no viable District 12 victors available, the Capitol assigns District 3 and 4 victors Wiress and Mags as mentors. Tributes from districts 1, 2, 4 and 5 make up the Career alliance, while the other districts nickname themselves the "Newcomers". During training, Beetee, a former victor forced to mentor his own son, Ampert, as punishment for rebellious activities, recruits Haymitch into a covert plan to sabotage the arena, assisted by Ampert, the Newcomers, Wiress, Mags, and Heavensbee, who is sympathetic to the tributes. Most of the Newcomers are unaware of their part in the plan. Haymitch adopts a "rascal" persona in the pre-game interviews to attract sponsors.

When the Games begin, Wyatt is killed by District 1's Silka while protecting Lou Lou, who finds her way to Haymitch, but dies after inhaling toxic pollen. Haymitch separates from the Newcomers and meets up with Ampert to carry out the sabotage. Their explosives flood the arena's underground passages, but fail to permanently disable its systems. Ampert is killed by carnivorous squirrel mutts, making Snow cleanse part of the arena with a volcanic explosion before interrogating everyone who contacted Haymitch prior to the Games, with Beetee taking the blame. To keep his cover, Plutarch suggests to Snow to preserve Haymitch and use him as an example to stop future uprisings.

Haymitch reunites with Maysilee, who kills Panache to save him. The two find a power generator at the arena's edge and discover the generator's protective force field. Waterbird mutts fatally injure Maysilee, who dies in Haymitch's arms. Afterwards, Silka pursues Haymitch to the arena's edge. When she throws her axe, Haymitch ducks, allowing the axe to rebound against the force field and kill Silka. Haymitch detonates his remaining explosives in a final attempt to destroy the arena and then loses consciousness.

After recovering in the Capitol, Haymitch discovers that the Games have been edited to hide his acts of rebellion, instead portraying him as selfishly cunning. He returns to District 12 to find his home in flames and his mother and brother murdered on Snow's orders. Haymitch reunites with Lenore Dove and unknowingly feeds her a poisoned gumdrop planted by Snow. As she dies, she urges Haymitch to prevent another "sunrise on the reaping." Devastated, Haymitch retreats into isolation at the Victors' Village, distancing himself from his friends, including Burdock Everdeen. Some time later, Plutarch visits and encourages Haymitch to continue his resistance. Over the following years, Haymitch descends into alcoholism while mentoring the succeeding District 12 tributes. One day, Haymitch watches Burdock and his wife, Asterid, with their newborn daughter, Katniss, while hiding from them.

Years later, with the Capitol overthrown and the Games abolished, (Note: As depicted in The Hunger Games: Mockingjay – Part 2 (2015)) Haymitch finds peace with an adult Katniss and her husband Peeta Mellark. Haymitch then heads to the tree where the geese gather, settling down to remember Lenore Dove.

== Cast ==
Tributes

- Joseph Zada as Haymitch Abernathy, one of the two male tributes from District 12 who is born on the same day as the Reaping.
  - Woody Harrelson as an older Haymitch Abernathy. Harrelson reprises his role from the original films.
- Mckenna Grace as Maysilee Donner, one of the two female tributes from District 12 and original owner of the Mockingjay pin.
  - Grace also portrays Merrilee Donner, Maysilee's twin sister.
- Ben Wang as Wyatt Callow, one of the two male tributes from District 12 and an oddsmaker.
- Molly McCann as Louella McCoy, one of the two female tributes from District 12 and Haymitch's childhood friend.
- Iona Bell as Lou Lou, Louella's Capitol-assigned lookalike.
- Percy Daggs IV as Ampert Latier, one of the two male tributes from District 3 and son of the victor Beetee Latier.
- Jhaleil Swaby as Panache Barker, one of the two male tributes from District 1.
- Laura Marcus as Silka Sharp, one of the two female tributes from District 1.
- Sky Frances as Maritte, one of the two female tributes from District 4.
- Rada Rae as Wellie, one of the two female tributes from District 6.
- Tatyana Muzondo as Ringina, one of the two female tributes from District 7.
- Alina Reid as Kerna, one of the two female tributes from District 9.
- Salimou Thiam as Clayton, one of the two male tributes from District 9.
- John Doeble as Buck, one of the two male tributes from District 10
- Kaine Buffonge as Hull, one of the two male tributes from District 11.

Capitol residents

- Jesse Plemons as Plutarch Heavensbee, a young cameraman for the Hunger Games. He was played by Philip Seymour Hoffman in the original films.
- Ralph Fiennes as Coriolanus Snow, the tyrannical president of Panem who in the past served as the mentor to Lucy Gray Baird, victor of the 10th Hunger Games, from District 12. He was played by Donald Sutherland in the original films, and by Tom Blyth in The Hunger Games: The Ballad of Songbirds & Snakes.
- Glenn Close as Drusilla Sickle, a Capitol escort for the District 12 tributes and Magno's wife.
- Kieran Culkin as Caesar Flickerman, the host of the Hunger Games. He was played by Stanley Tucci in the original films.
- Elle Fanning as Effie Trinket, a Capitol stylist for the District 12 tributes. She was played by Elizabeth Banks in the original films.
- Billy Porter as Magno Stift, a Capitol stylist for the District 12 tributes and Drusilla's husband.
- Iris Apatow as Proserpina Trinket, a Capitol prep team member for the District 12 tributes and Effie's younger sister.
- Edvin Ryding as Vitus, a Capitol prep team member for the District 12 tributes.
- Sandra Förster as Hersilia, a trainer for the Hunger Games.
- Jax Guerrero as Tibby, a transportation attendant for the District 12 tributes.

Mentors

- Maya Hawke as Wiress, victor of the 49th Hunger Games, from District 3. She was played by Amanda Plummer in The Hunger Games: Catching Fire.
- Kelvin Harrison Jr. as Beetee Latier, victor of the 34th Hunger Games, from District 3. His son Ampert is a tribute in the 50th Hunger Games. He was played by Jeffrey Wright in the original films.
- Lili Taylor as Mags Flanagan, victor of the 11th Hunger Games, from District 4. She was played by Lynn Cohen in Catching Fire.

District 12 residents

- Whitney Peak as Lenore Dove Baird, Haymitch's girlfriend and a member of the Covey to which Lucy Gray belonged.
- Kara Tointon as Willamae Abernathy, Haymitch's mother.
- Smylie Bradwell as Sid Abernathy, Haymitch's younger brother.
- Scot Greenan as Burdock Everdeen, Haymitch's best friend, Asterid's boyfriend, the future father of Katniss and Primrose and Lenore Dove's distant relative. He was played by Phillip Troy Linger in the original films.
- Grace Ackary as Asterid March, Maysilee's best friend, Burdock's girlfriend, and the future mother of Katniss and Primrose. She was played by Paula Malcomson in the original films.
- Jeffrey Hallman as Clerk Carmine, Lenore Dove's uncle. He was played by Konstantin Taffet in The Ballad of Songbirds & Snakes.
- Serafin Mishiev as Woodbine Chance, who is selected as one of the tributes for the 50th Hunger Games, until Haymitch is forced to take his place.
- Melody Chikakane Brown as Hattie Meeney, a bootlegger and Haymitch's friend.
- Devon Singletary as Blair, Haymitch and Burdock's friend.
- Jefferson White as Mr. McCoy, Louella's father.

Additionally, Jennifer Lawrence and Josh Hutcherson reprise their roles as Katniss Everdeen and Peeta Mellark, respectively, in the film's epilogue.

== Production ==
=== Development ===
Adaptation rights for the film were acquired by Lionsgate Films simultaneously with Suzanne Collins's announcement of the Sunrise on the Reaping novel (2025) in June 2024. Principal photography took place between July and November 2025 across locations in Spain and Germany. Franchise producer Nina Jacobson and her fellow Lionsgate filmmakers, however, were made aware of Collins' plans for a new novel as far as back to the premiere of The Hunger Games: The Ballad of Songbirds & Snakes (2023) when Collins' agent hinted to them that the author was working on another book before they received an unexpected phone call that announced that Collins had written such book, which she finished sooner than expected as they expected it to be published years later, after which they were sent a manuscript and they didn't speak about it due to a non-disclosure agreement over months until the novel was properly announced.

In June 2024, with the announcement that Collins would be publishing her next installment in The Hunger Games series on March 18, 2025, titled Sunrise on the Reaping, Lionsgate Films had greenlit a feature film adaptation of the book, with Francis Lawrence in talks to return to direct. Lawrence enjoyed the challenge of directing a prequel to the original Hunger Games films, he did not feel it was a "headache" and instead found a real joy in the job, feeling that Collins' writing informed from both directions. He wanted to make each film to work on its own without the audience needing to have seen past entries, allowing people to with no idea of who the protagonist is to follow his story forward and for those who know already know to go backwards and learn about the other characters who accompany him.

=== Casting ===
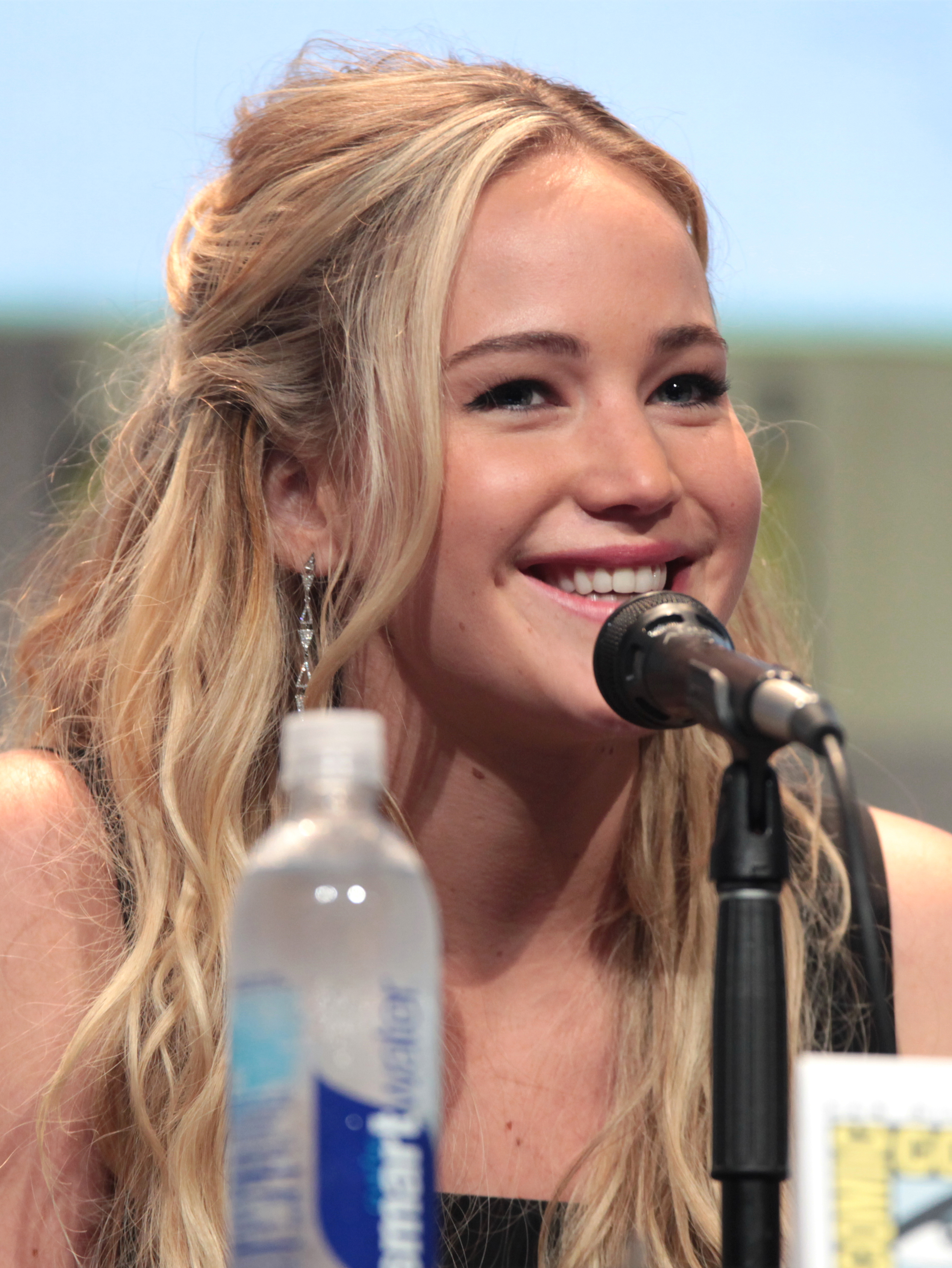
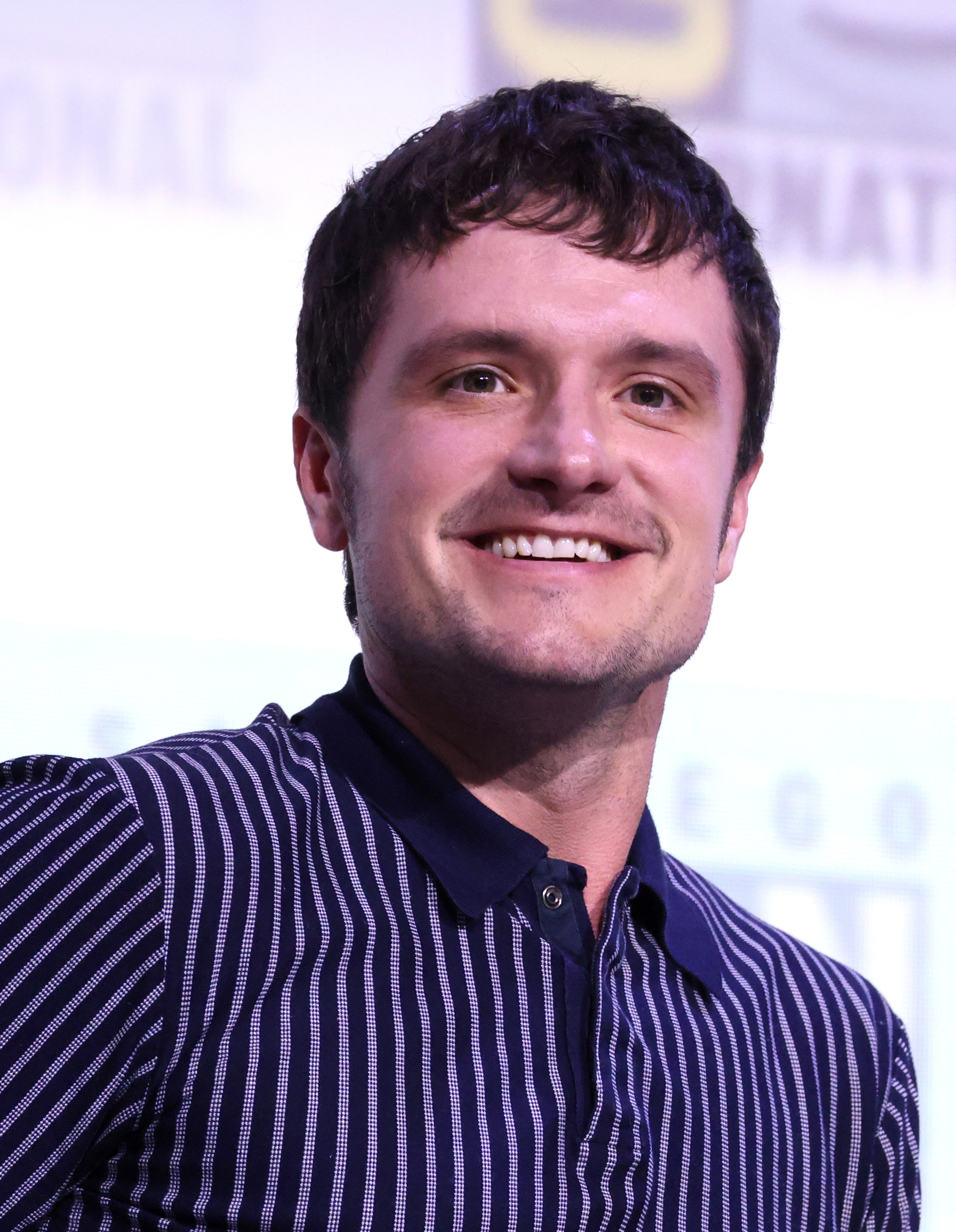
Jennifer Lawrence and Josh Hutcherson reprise their roles as Katniss Everdeen and Peeta Mellark from the original series

Casting directors Debra Zane and Dylan Jury began casting the film in December 2024; a casting call was put out for young Haymitch, Lenore Dove, and Maysilee, and Zane and Jury began making lists for the younger adult versions of legacy characters.

From April to June 2025, much of the ensemble was cast, including Joseph Zada, Whitney Peak, Mckenna Grace, Jesse Plemons, Kelvin Harrison Jr., Maya Hawke, Lili Taylor, Ben Wang, Ralph Fiennes, Molly McCann, Iona Bell, Elle Fanning, Kieran Culkin, Glenn Close, Billy Porter, Jhaleil Swaby, Laura Marcus, Percy Daggs IV, and Rada Rae. To prepare for his role as a teenage Haymitch Abernathy, Zada watched fifteen episodes of Cheers (1982–1993) that starred Woody Harrelson, who played Haymitch in the original The Hunger Games films, as Woody Boyd and True Detective (2014–present), Zada felt that he needed something else in addition to the former and that the latter wasn't quite helpful due to starring Harrelson as an adult already, so he watched White Men Can't Jump (1992) a lot despite Harrelson being nine years older than Zada is in the film. Noah Schnapp also auditioned for the role of Haymitch. In regards of how they approached playing legacy characters like Mags Flanagan, Beetee Latier and Wiress, Taylor opted to stick to Collins' novels as her source material and do some research on fan wikis as factual groundwork before Lawrence gave her all necessary information to not overthink or overact, Harrison Jr. decided to not create anything more than what was offered to him other than taking more liberty in figuring out his character's father-son dynamic with Ampert due to them not having enough screentime to establish it and Hawke invented a little bit of backstory for her performance due to finding important her character's trauma timeline so she imagined what she must have felt and lived inside. Tom Blyth, who played a younger Coriolanus Snow in The Ballad of Songbirds & Snakes, expressed interest in coming back for the role when Lawrence texted him about missing him, suggesting the use of prosthetics to make him look 65 years old, but wasn't brought back. More casting announcements were made in July, including Kara Tointon, Jefferson White, Iris Apatow, and Edvin Ryding. In October, Devon Singletary joined the cast after winning an open audition competition.

In December 2025, it was reported that Jennifer Lawrence and Josh Hutcherson would be reprising their roles as Katniss Everdeen and Peeta Mellark in the film. The following month when asked if she would be collaborating with director Francis Lawrence on the film, Jennifer Lawrence said: "Maybe we already have [...] Oh, yeah. It is out on the internet, isn't it?" In October 2026, Lawrence revealed that Harrelson would also be reprising his role as an older Haymitch.

=== Filming ===
Principal photography began in late July in Spain, and was teased by official Hunger Games social media accounts on August 6, 2025. Shooting locations included Somiedo and Teverga. By November, Fanning and Close had concluded filming their scenes. Principal photography officially wrapped in Berlin on November 28.

=== Music ===
In April 2026, James Newton Howard was announced to return to compose the film in his sixth time with the franchise, marking his eighth collaboration with Lawrence. A remix version of the Who's 1973 song titled "Love, Reign o'er Me" (Boomerang remix) was featured from the film's first trailer, released on May 30, 2026. The Hunger Games: Sunrise on the Reaping (The Album), the film's soundtrack album, was released on November 13, 2026, through MCA. "Draw You Out" by Noah Kahan serves as its lead single, released on October 2, 2026. The album is produced by Dave Cobb and contains a total of 29 tracks, including "Deep in the Meadow" featured in the first film and "The Old Therebefore" from the first prequel film. On October 16, "Black Stars" by the Smashing Pumpkins was released, along with an accompanying music video, while "Favor" by Gigi Perez was released on October 29. "The Wheel" by Lizzy McAlpine was released as the album's fourth single on November 6, 2026. Newton's score, The Hunger Games: Sunrise on the Reaping – The Score, is scheduled for release on November 20, 2026, with the track "Haymitch Meets Snow" released on October 23.

== Marketing ==
On November 20, 2025, exactly a year from theatrical release, an official teaser for the film was released before filming had even ended. On April 6, 2026, a statue depicting a metal snake and songbird surrounded by flowers was erected in Millennium Park in Chicago. This was followed by another 31 statues across 30 different countries. The statues were accompanied by cards with quotes from the previous films and books printed on them. The first theatrical trailer was released on April 13, 2026. A featurette titled "Meet Haymitch" was released on July 4, 2026, featuring new clips from the film, behind the scenes footage, and interviews with the cast and crew. On August 21, 2026, the website Capitol.tv, which had been used to promote the previous films, was reactivated. In-universe promotional material was revealed, along with a two-minute video narrated by Ralph Fiennes as Coriolanus Snow. On September 7, 2026, three new videos were released on the website, featuring more in-universe propaganda starring Capitol citizens, with one of them featuring Glenn Close as Drusilla Sickle. The second and final theatrical trailer was released on September 16, 2026.

== Release ==
The Hunger Games: Sunrise on the Reaping premiered in Westfield, London on October 28, 2026, and was theatrically released in the United States on November 20, 2026, in RealD 3D, IMAX, 4DX, ScreenX and D-Box.

== Reception ==
On the review aggregator website Rotten Tomatoes, 68% of 176 critics' reviews are positive, with an average rating of 6.6/10. Metacritic, which uses a weighted average, assigns the film a score of 56 out of 100, based on 39 critics, indicating "mixed or average" reviews. Audiences polled by CinemaScore gave it a grade of A-, on a scale of A+ to F.

William Bibbiani of TheWrap praised the film, saying that it "strikes the most effective balance between crowd-pleasing engagement and sobering commentary in the whole series." David Rooney of The Hollywood Reporter wrote, "Invested with tenacity, kindness and heartrending vulnerability by Zada, Haymitch provides a much more poignant and involving origin story than that of Coriolanus Snow in the lumbering first prequel, The Ballad of Songbirds and Snakes." Owen Gleiberman of Variety wrote, "The film is meandering and more than a bit thin, but unlike The Ballad of Songbirds & Snakes it’s been directed, by Francis Lawrence, in that lavish mode of surface intensity we might now call Hunger Games Classic."

In a negative review, Brandon Yu of The New York Times wrote, "[It] manages to be both bloated and limited. There is a cloistered feeling to its vision of both the games and the wider dystopian world. It ultimately has a faint reason for this by the end, but it translates to a story trapped in a bubble." Tim Grierson of Screen International wrote, "An origin story without a sense of grandeur or stakes. Rather than setting up the epic Katniss narrative that transfixed millions of moviegoers, this prequel feels oddly incidental -- a drab afterthought rather than a crucial new chapter." Peter Bradshaw of The Guardian rated the film 1 out of 5 stars, berating it as having "no actual interest and no authentic reason to exist, other than to gouge an income stream out of its fanbase". Giving the film a 4-point score, Juan Pablo Cinelli of Página/12 deemed it to be "flat, predictable, full of underdeveloped, irrelevant and even pointless subplots. And worst of all: completetely lacking of creativity".
