= Green Lantern (soundtrack) =

Green Lantern (Original Motion Picture Soundtrack)

Soundtrack album by James Newton Howard
- Released: June 14, 2011
- Recorded: 2011
- Studio: Abbey Road Studios, London; AIR Studios, London; The Village, Los Angeles; Sony Scoring Stage, Sony Pictures Studios, Culver City, California; James Newton Howard Studios, Santa Monica, California
- Genre: Film score
- Length: 52:47
- Label: WaterTower Music
- Producer: James Newton Howard

James Newton Howard chronology
Water for Elephants (2011)	Green Lantern (2011)	Larry Crowne (2011)

Green Lantern (Original Motion Picture Soundtrack) is the film score composed by James Newton Howard to the 2011 superhero film Green Lantern directed by Martin Campbell based on the character from DC Comics, and starred Ryan Reynolds as Ryan Reynolds stars as Hal Jordan / Green Lantern, alongside Blake Lively, Peter Sarsgaard, Mark Strong, Angela Bassett, and Tim Robbins. The album featured 18 tracks which was released through WaterTower Music on June 14, 2011.

== Background ==
In January 2011, it was announced that James Newton Howard would compose the musical score for Green Lantern. Howard previously associated with Campbell on Vertical Limit (2000), and also composed the DC Comics superhero films Batman Begins (2005) and The Dark Knight (2008) with Hans Zimmer. For the film, Howard composed large orchestral themes and electronic, hard rock elements for the titular superhero and the antagonist respectively. The score was recorded at the Abbey Road Studios and AIR Studios in London, along with the Sony Scoring Stage in Sony Pictures Studios, and the Village studio in Los Angeles. The soundtrack was released through WaterTower Music on June 14, 2011, featuring 18 tracks and also included the "Green Lantern Oath" by Reynolds.

== Track listing ==
All music is composed by James Newton Howard.

No.	Title	Length
1.	"Prologue/Parallax Unbound"	3:09
2.	"Abin Sur Attacked"	1:08
3.	"Carol Scolds Hal"	1:21
4.	"Drone Dogfight"	3:15
5.	"Did Adam Put You Up to This?"	2:25
6.	"The Ring Chooses Hal"	2:34
7.	"Genesis of Good and Evil"	2:35
8.	"The Induction Process"	3:05
9.	"Welcome to Oa"	1:42
10.	"We're Going to Fly Now"	1:53
11.	"You Reek of Fear"	2:13
12.	"The Origin of Parallax"	3:25
13.	"Run"	5:30
14.	"You Have to Be Chosen"	7:29
15.	"Hector's Analysis"	1:06
16.	"Hal Battles Parallax"	7:19
17.	"The Corps"	2:19
18.	"Green Lantern Oath" (featuring Ryan Reynolds)	0:19
Total length:		52:47

== Reception ==
Thomas Glorieux of Maintitles wrote "During many years James Newton Howard was always one of my safety nets, a composer who had such a typical voice one could rely on. Even his less inspired efforts of late still had that tone, but that is mostly gone in Green Lantern. What's even more disappointing, Green Lantern is a box office movie. Not a very good one, but still heroic material that could have received a better heroic score." James Southall of Movie Wave wrote "It's all so tired-sounding, all so free of anything which might entice anybody back to listen again; it's not quite Iron Man-bad, but in some ways it's even more disappointing than that was, since we actually know what this composer's capable of doing."

Filmtracks wrote "Howard rarely sleepwalks through these major scores, but a sampling of his snoring could have been used to augment the sound design in Green Lantern and nobody would have noticed the difference." Daniel Schwieger of AssignmentX wrote "Green Lantern is all musical colors of the Hollywood blockbuster rainbow- at once aware of its hero's cosmic significance, the utter sci-fi strangeness of his shtick, and the rhythmic rock imperative of most superhero scoring nowadays. Like the movie that proudly wears his ring, there's nothing about Green Lantern that's escaped James Newton Howard's musical sight."

R. L. Shaffer of IGN wrote "James Newton Howard's overbearing score plays them out." Bill Graham of Collider wrote "even James Newton Howard's score is mostly uninspired". Melody MacCready of Screen Rant wrote "Howard composed a score that was equally as thrilling as it was fun. It matched the tone for a character as energetic as Green Lantern, but when it wanted to present the epicness of a scene, Howard did his job. His soundtrack could have easily been used for the likes of Superman or Spider-Man." The cue "We're Going to Fly Now" has been regarded as one of the best superhero score cues of the 21st century by Inverse.

== Personnel credits ==
Credits adapted from liner notes:

- Music composer and producer – James Newton Howard
- Co-producer – Jim Weidman, Stuart Michael Thomas
- Sound designer – Mel Wesson
- Additional sound design – Alex Kharlamov, Matt Ward, Ryeland Allison
- Recording and mixing – Shawn Murphy
- Recordist – Adam Michalak
- Additional recording – Ed Cherney
- Additional mixing – Alan Meyerson
- Mastering – Louie Teran
- Supervising music editor – Jim Weidman
- Music editor – David Olson
- Scoring coordinator – Pamela Sollie
- Scoring crew – Chris Barrett, David Marquette, Evan Rautiainen, Greg Hayes, Greg Loskorn, Kris Burton, Lewis Jones, Mark Eshelman, Vanessa Parr
- Pro Tools operator – David Channing, Erik Swanson, Noah Snyder
- Executive producer – Paul Broucek
- Music preparation – Dave Hage, Mark Graham
- Art direction – Sandeep Sriram

Choir

- Choir – London Voices
- Choir conductor – Jo Buckley
- Choir contractor – Isobel Griffiths
- Choirmaster – Ben Parry, Terry Edwards
- Choir recording – Geoff Foster
- Countertenor vocals – Grant Gershon

Orchestra

- Orchestra – London Contemporary Orchestra
- Orchestrators – Bruce Babcock, Conrad Pope, Jeff Atmajian, Jon Kull, Marcus Trumpp, Pete Anthony
- Orchestra conductor – Pete Anthony
- Additional orchestra conductor – Mike Nowak
- Orchestra leader – Roger Wilkie
- Orchestra contractor – Decrescent and Rotter Music Contracting

Instruments

- Bass – Bruce Morgenthaler, Christian Kollgaard, David Parmeter, Drew D. Dembowsk, Edward Meares, Geoffrey Osika, Michael Valerio, Neil Garber, Nico Carmine Abondolo, Nico Philippon, Oscar Hidalgo, Stephen Dress, Sue Ranney, Tim Eckert
- Bassoon – Kenneth Munday, Michael O'Donovan
- Cello – Andrew Shulman, Antony Cooke, Armen Ksajikian, Cecelia Tsan, Christina Soule, Chris Ermacoff, David Speltz, Dennis Karmazyn, Erika Duke-Kirkpatrick, George Kim Scholes, Giovanna Clayton, John Walz, Kevin Torfeh, Paul Cohen, Paula Hochhalter, Steve Erdody, Timothy Landauer, Trevor Handy, Vanessa Freebairn-Smith
- Clarinet – Benjamin E. Lulich, Stuart Clark
- Flute – Geraldine Rotella, Heather Clark
- Guitar – Marc Bonilla, Stuart Michael Thomas
- Harp – Gayle Levant, Marcia Dickstein
- Horn – Bruce Hudson, Daniel P. Kelley, Danielle Ondraza, David Everson, David Duke, James W. Thatcher, Jennie L. Kim, Mark L. Adams, Phil Yao, Steven Becknell, William Lane
- Oboe – Barbara Northcutt, David Weiss, Thomas Boyd
- Percussion – Alan Estes, Robert Zimmitti, Don Williams, Gregory Goodall, Peter Limonick
- Piano, keyboards – Randy Kerber
- Trombone – Alexander Iles, Andrew Thomas Malloy, William F. Reichenbach, Kenneth Kugler, Michael M. Hoffman, Phillip Teele, Phillip Keen, Steven Suminski, Steven M. Holtman, William Booth
- Trumpet – Barry Perkins, David Washburn, Jon Lewis, Malcolm McNab, Timothy G. Morrison
- Tuba – Doug Tornquist, James Self
- Viola – Alma L. Fernandez, Andrew Duckles, Brian Dembow, Carolyn Riley, Dale Hikawa-Silverman, Darrin McCann, David F. Walther, Denyse Buffman, Gina Coletti, Jennie Hansen, Keith Greene, Lauren Chipman, Luke A. Maurer, Marlow Fisher, Matthew Funes, Michael Nowak, Pam Jacobson, Pamela Goldsmith, Robert Berg, Robert A. Brophy, Roland Kato, Shawn Mann, Thomas Diener, Vicki Miskolczy
- Violin – Alan Grunfeld, Alyssa Park, Ana Landauer, Armen Anassian, Belinda Broughton, Bruce Dukov, Darius Campo, Dimitrie Leivici, Elizabeth Hedman, Endre Granat, Eun-Mee Ahn, Haim Shtrum, Helen Nightengale, Henry Gronnier, Irina Voloshina, Jaqueline Brand, Jay Rosen, Jeanne Skrocki, Jessica E. Guideri, Joel Pargman, Josefina Vergara, Julie Ann Gigante, Katia Popov, Ken Yerke, Kevin Connolly, Lisa M. Sutton, Lorand Lokuszta, Miwako Watanabe, Natalie Leggett, Neil Samples, Nina Evtuhov, Phillip Levy, Radu Pieptea, Rafael Rishik, Roberto Cani, Roger Wilkie, Sara Parkins, Sarah Thornblade, Searmi Park, Serena Mc Kinney, Tamara Hatwan, Tereza Stanislav

== Accolades ==
Awards	Date of ceremony	Category	Recipient(s)	Result	Ref.
ASCAP Film and Television Music Awards	June 28, 2012	Top Box Office Films	James Newton Howard	Won	
