= The Hunger Games: Catching Fire (score) =

The Hunger Games: Catching Fire (Original Motion Picture Score)

Film score by James Newton Howard
- Released: November 25, 2013
- Studios: AIR Studios, London
- Genre: Film score
- Length: 1:14:58
- Label: Republic
- Producer: James Newton Howard

James Newton Howard film score chronology
After Earth (2013)	The Hunger Games: Catching Fire (2013)	Parkland (2013)

The Hunger Games: Catching Fire (Original Motion Picture Score) is the score album to the 2013 film The Hunger Games: Catching Fire. James Newton Howard who scored the predecessor, returned to score Catching Fire in October 2012. The score was released by Republic Records on November 25, 2013, which includes twenty-nine tracks from Howard's score. A cue from the album, "We're a Team" was co-written by members of the British rock band Coldplay—Guy Berryman, Jonny Buckland, Will Champion, and Chris Martin. The band also performed the song "Atlas" which released as the lead single from the soundtrack on September.

== Reception ==
James Christopher Monger of AllMusic praised the score as an "ethereal mix of stoic melodies and bold action cues" that conveyed the film's darker theme, but maintained a "soulful undercurrent" to reflect the protagonist's emotional journey. Filmtracks.com wrote: "Howard improves upon his work in the franchise with this sequel, finally having the time to adequately develop his many themes into better representations of concepts in the film. The issue with this music continues to be muddy attributions of those themes and the composer's seeming inability to really shine with any of them. None of Howard's themes enunciates itself with enough consistency and clarity to truly serve as the franchise's musical identity [...] Some of Howard's own themes, especially the love theme, could still evolve into that dominant identity, but he may never get the opportunity if the productions insist upon having outside influences define the songs or source cues."

Music critic Jonathan Broxton of Movie Music UK opined that the album is not competent with the predecessor's music, where the action music is "generally excellent" and rises to "exceptional emotional highs" in some occasion, but felt that the score is less than what demanded. James Southall of Movie Wave criticised it as a "huge step down from the first score" with the majority of the album is a "tiresome drone" and hardly left anything from the predecessor's score. He disappointed on Howard failing to "grasp on a fine, distinctive score and extend it into something to give the series' a musical backdrop" and instead sounded it like a "Brand X score from that year". Thomas Glorieux of Maintitles criticised the score as "long, boring, unrenewable" and lacked the highlights of the predecessor.

== Track listing ==
All tracks are written by James Newton Howard, except where noted.

No.	Title	Writer(s)	Length
1.	"Katniss"		1:42
2.	"I Had to Do That"		2:22
3.	"We Have Visitors"		3:01
4.	"Just Friends"		1:29
5.	"Mockingjay Graffiti"		1:44
6.	"The Tour"		5:56
7.	"Daffodil Waltz"		0:26
8.	"Waltz in A (Op. 39, No. 15)"		0:43
9.	"Fireworks"		3:05
10.	"Horn of Plenty"		0:36
11.	"Peacekeepers"		5:55
12.	"Prim"		2:08
13.	"A Quarter Quell"		2:05
14.	"Katniss is Chosen"		3:18
15.	"Introducing the Tributes"		1:29
16.	"There's Always a Flaw"		1:48
17.	"Bow and Arrow"		1:07
18.	"We're a Team"	Guy Berryman; Jonny Buckland; Will Champion; Chris Martin	1:52
19.	"Let's Start"		2:02
20.	"The Games Begin"		4:43
21.	"Peeta's Heart Stops"		2:10
22.	"Treetops"		1:22
23.	"The Fog"		4:58
24.	"Monkey Mutts"		4:44
25.	"Jabberjays"		1:33
26.	"I Need You"		3:57
27.	"Broken Wire"		3:53
28.	"Arena Crumbles"		1:43
29.	"Good Morning Sweetheart"		3:07
Total length:			1:14:58

== Credits ==
Credits adapted from CD liner notes.

- Music composed and produced by – James Newton Howard
- Co-producer – Jim Weidman, Sunna Wehrmeijer, Sven Faulconer
- Synth programming – Christopher Wray, Dave Porter, Sunna Wehrmeijer, Sven Faulconer
- Additional arrangements – Sunna Wehrmeijer, Sven Faulconer
- Engineer – Matt Ward
- Recording – Erik Swanson, Shawn Murphy
- Mixing – Shawn Murphy
- Mastering – Dave Collins
- Music editor – David Olson
- Supervising music editor – Jim Weidman
- Score editor – David Channing
- Technician – Chris Cozens, Richard Grant
- Score coordinator – Pamela Sollie
- Music preparation – Dakota Music Service
- Packaging and design – Olivia Smith
- Liner notes – Francis Lawrence

Instruments

- Bass – Allen Walley, Leon Bosch, Mary Scully, Paddy Lannigan, Richard Pryce, Roger Linley, Steve Mair, Steve McManus
- Cello – Anthony Lewis, Caroline Dearnley, Chris Worsey, Dave Daniels, Frank Schaefer, Ian Burdge, Joely Koos, John Heley, Jonathan Williams, Josephine Knight, Martin Loveday, Melissa Phelps, Nick Cooper, Paul Kegg, Josephine Knight (soloist)
- Clarinet – Nicholas Bucknall
- Dulcimer – Jon Banks
- Ethnic flute – Jan Hendrickse
- Fiddle – Sonia Slany (soloist)
- Flute – Eliza Marshall, Karen Jones, Nina Robertson
- Guitar – John Parricelli
- Harp – Skaila Kanga
- Horn – Carsten Williams, David Pyatt, John Thurgood, Martin Owen, Nigel Black, Phil Woods, Richard Berry, Richard Watkins, Simon Rayner
- Oboe, cor Anglais – Chris Cowie, Daniel Bates
- Percussion – Chris Baron, Frank Ricotti, Gary Kettel, Paul Clarvis, Sam Walton, Stephen Henderson, Bill Lockhart
- Piano, celesta – Simon Chamberlain
- Trombone – Andy Wood, Dave Stewart, Edward Tarrant, Mark Nightingale, Mike Hext, Richard Edwards, Roger Argente
- Trumpet – Andy Crowley, Kate Moore, Paul Mayes, Simon Munday
- Tuba – Oren Marshall, Owen Slade
- Viola – Andy Parker, Bill Hawkes, Bob Smissen, Bruce White, Claire Finnimore, Don McVay, Edward Vander Spar, Fiona Bonds, Garfield Jackson, Helen Kamminga, Julia Knight, Kate Musker, Martin Humbey, Peter Lale, Phil D'arcy, Rachel Bolt, Reiad Chibah, Richard Cookson, Rusen Gunes, Steve Wright, Sue Dench, Vicci Wardman
- Violin – Boguslaw Kostecki, Cathy Thompson, Chris Tombling, Clare Thompson, Debbie Preece, Debbie Widdup, Liz Edwards, Emlyn Singleton, Everton Nelson, Gaby Lester, Ian Humphries, Jonathan Rees, Jonathan Strange, Julian Leaper, Julian Tear, Kathy Gowers, Lorraine McAslan, Mark Berrow, Natalia Bonner, Patrick Kiernan, Perry Montague Mason, Philippa Ibbotson, Philippe Honoré, Ralph De Souza, Rita Manning, Robin Brightman, Roger Garland, Sonia Slany, Sophie Langdon, Steve Morris, Thomas Bowes, Tom Pigott-Smith, Warren Zelinski

Vocals

- Alto – Alex Gibson, Amanda Dean, Claire Henry, Clara Sanabras, Deryn Edwards, Helen Brookes, Jo Marshall, Judith Rees, Nicola Beckley, Polly May
- Bass – Cheyney Kent, James Holliday, John Evanson, Lawrence Wallington, Michael Dore, Neil Bellingham, Nigel Short, Russell Matthews, Simon Preece, Stefan Berkieta
- Soprano – Ali Hill, Carys L. Robert, Cheryl Enever, Eleanor Meynell, Eli Rolfe Johnson, Elizabeth Drury, Grace Davidson, Jacqueline Barron, Natalie C. Griffiths, Rachel Major, Wendy Nieper
- Tenor – Benedict Hymas, Benedict Quirke, Dan L. Thomas, Gareth Morris, Jon Bungard, Julian A. Smith, Peter Wilman, Richard E. Wilson, Richard Eteson, Simon Haynes, Tom Herford
- Additional vocals – Sunna Wehrmeijer

Orchestra and choir

- Orchestration – Jeff Atmajian, John Ashton Thomas, Jon Kull, Pete Anthony, Peter Bateman
- Orchestra leader – Thomas Bowes
- Orchestra and choir conductor – Pete Anthony
- Orchestra contractor – Isobel Griffiths
- Assistant orchestra contractor – Jo Buckley
- Choir – London Voices
- Choirmaster – Ben Parry, Terry Edwards

Management

- Executive in charge of film music (Lionsgate) – Tracy McKnight, Rona Rapadas
- Music business affairs (Lionsgate) – Lenny Wohl
- Contact Administration – Karen Sidlow
- Senior director of film music (Lionsgate)– Trevon Kezios
- Music budget supervisor (Lionsgate) – Chris Brown
- Film music coordinator (Lionsgate) – Nikki Triplett, Ryan Svendsen
