= The Hunger Games: Mockingjay – Part 1 (score) =

The Hunger Games: Mockingjay – Part 1 (Original Motion Picture Score)

Film score by James Newton Howard
- Released: November 24, 2014
- Recorded: AIR Studios, London
- Genre: Film score
- Length: 1:09:38
- Label: Republic
- Producers: James Newton Howard; Sven Faulconer

James Newton Howard film score chronology
| Nightcrawler (2014) | The Hunger Games: Mockingjay – Part 1 (2013) | Pawn Sacrifice (2014) |

Singles from The Hunger Games: Mockingjay – Part 1 (Original Motion Picture Score)
- 1. "The Hanging Tree" Released: December 9, 2014

The Hunger Games: Mockingjay – Part 1 (Original Motion Picture Score) is the score album to the 2014 film The Hunger Games: Mockingjay – Part 1. James Newton Howard who composed music for the previous installments, returned to score for Mockingjay – Part 1. The soundtrack was released by Republic Records on November 24, 2014, three days after the film's release. It includes Howard's score along with the original song "The Hanging Tree" performed by Jennifer Lawrence.

== Track listing ==
All music is composed by James Newton Howard, except where noted.

| No. | Title | Lyrics | Music | Performer | Length |
|---|---|---|---|---|---|
| 1. | "The Mockingjay" | | | | 2:39 |
| 2. | "Remind Her Who the Enemy Is" | | | | 2:29 |
| 3. | "District 12" | | | | 3:23 |
| 4. | "Snow's Speech" | | | | 3:32 |
| 5. | "Please Welcome Peeta" | | | | 3:53 |
| 6. | "Katniss' Nightmare" | | | | 2:06 |
| 7. | "The Arsenal" | | | | 3:54 |
| 8. | "Incoming Bombers" | | | | 4:33 |
| 9. | "Don't Be a Fool Katniss" | | | | 1:40 |
| 10. | "District 12 Ruins" | | | | 3:38 |
| 11. | "The Hanging Tree" | Suzanne Collins | Jeremiah Fraites, Wesley Schultz | Jennifer Lawrence | 3:38 |
| 12. | "Peeta's Broadcast" | | | | 1:45 |
| 13. | "Air Raid Drill" | | | | 4:31 |
| 14. | "It's Gonna Be a Long Night" | | | | 2:26 |
| 15. | "Taunting the Cat" | | | | 2:08 |
| 16. | "White Roses" | | | | 3:25 |
| 17. | "District 8 Hospital" | | | | 2:07 |
| 18. | "The Broadcast" | | | | 1:11 |
| 19. | "Jamming the Capitol" | | | | 3:27 |
| 20. | "Inside the Tribute Center" | | | | 3:44 |
| 21. | "Put Me on the Air" | | | | 3:10 |
| 22. | "They're Back" | | | | 2:47 |
| 23. | "Victory" | | | | 2:54 |

== "The Hanging Tree" ==
"The Hanging Tree" is the single released from the Mockingjay – Part 1 score on November 25, 2014. Performed by the lead actress Jennifer Lawrence, written by the author Suzanne Collins—originally appeared in her novel Mockingjay (2010)—and composed by Jeremiah Fraites and Wesley Schultz from American indie folk band the Lumineers, with Howard producing the score, the song is a folk ballad that features orchestral strings and a choir. The song debuted at number 12 on the US Billboard Hot 100, becoming the highest-charting song from the Hunger Games film series, surpassing "Eyes Open" by Taylor Swift. It further peaked at number one in Austria, Germany, Hungary, in the top five in Australia, and certified platinum by Music Canada (MC) and double platinum by the Recording Industry Association of America (RIAA).

The song was initially not included in the film's soundtrack, however due to the tremendous success, the song was included in the digital extended edition as the 15th track from the album, which was released on December 9. A remix of the track by Michael Gazzo, titled as "The Hanging Tree (Rebel Remix)" was released on December 15, 2014.

== Reception ==
Music critic Jonathan Broxton of Movie Music UK hailed the score for Mockingjay – Part 1 as the "strongest one" from the Hunger Games scores, though despite claiming the subtlety of its restrained nature, and the "lack of truly significant thematic statements being disappointingly anonymous", the score had enough emotion in the quieter moments made up for the lack of overt melodic ideas. He praised "The Hanging Tree" as the "standout single moments of the year". Filmtracks.com also accomplished the score, the best among the three film scores for the series, while writing "despite its continuing melodic haziness, it achieves greater potential for enjoyment with each entry". James Southall of Movie Wave praised that the score had plenty of moments to offer the audiences, but criticized the excessive length of the album and felt that it did not get into the Maleficent (which Howard had composed).

Listing it as one of the best scores and soundtracks of 2014 (along with Maleficent), Michelle McCue and Melissa Thompson of We Are Movie Geeks wrote that the music for both films "cover the whole breadth of experience from scenes of epic action to moments of epic heartache and intimate poignancy". Den of Geek also listed the score as one of 2014's best film scores; critic Ivan Redford wrote that the "darker development of themes match the growing sense of identity of its protagonist".

== Accolades ==
| Award | Category | Recipients | Result | Ref. |
|---|---|---|---|---|
| International Film Music Critics Association | Film Composer of the Year | James Newton Howard | Nominated | |
| International Film Music Critics Association | Best Original Score for an Action/Adventure/Thriller Film | James Newton Howard | Nominated | |

== Credits ==
Credits adapted from CD liner notes:

- Composer – James Newton Howard
- Producer – James Newton Howard, Sven Faulconer
- Co-producer – Jim Weidman
- Synth programming – Christopher Wray, Sunna Wehrmeijer, Sven Faulconer
- Additional arrangements – Sunna Wehrmeijer, Sven Faulconer
- Sound designer – Joe Trapanese
- Engineer – Matt Ward
- Recording – Shawn Murphy
- Mixing – Erik Swanson, Shawn Murphy
- Mastering – Dave Collins
- Music editor – David Olson
- Supervising music editor – Jim Weidman
- Score editor – David Channing
- Score coordinator – Pamela Sollie
- Scoring crew – Adam Miller, John Prestage, Toby Kettel
- Music preparation – Dakota Music Service
- Music librarian – Mark Graham
- Technician – Chris Cozens, Richard Grant

Instruments

- Bass – Allen Walley, Andy Marshall, Andy Pask, Mary Scully, Richard Pryce, Steve Williams, Steve Mair
- Bassoon, contrabassoon – Gavin McNaughton
- Cello – Caroline Dale, Chris Worsey, Dave Daniels, Frank Schaefer, Ian Burdge, Joely Koos, John Heley, Jonathan Williams, Josephine Knight, Martin Loveday, Nick Cooper, Paul Kegg, Tony Lewis, Josephine Knight (soloist), Richard Tunnicliffe (baroque)
- Clarinet, bass Clarinet – David Fuest, Nick Rodwell
- Fiddle – Giles Lewin, Sonia Slany (soloists)
- Flute – Anna Noakes, Michael Cox, Nina Robertson, Siobhan Grealy
- Harp – Skaila Kanga
- Horn – David Pyatt, John Thurgood, Martin Owen, Nigel Black, Richard Berry, Richard Bissill, Richard Watkins
- Oboe, cor Anglais – John Anderson
- Percussion – Frank Ricotti, Gary Kettel, Paul Clarvis, Bill Lockhart
- Piano, celesta – Simon Chamberlain
- Trombone – Andy Wood, Dave Stewart, Mark Templeton, Richard Edwards
- Trumpet – Andrew Crowley, Gareth Small, Philip Cobb
- Tuba – Jim Anderson, Lee Tsarmaklis, Owen Slade
- Viola – Andy Parker, Bruce White, Fiona Bonds, George Robertson, Gustav Clarkson, Julia Knight, Kate Musker, Max Baillie, Paul Cassidy, Peter Lale, Rachel Bolt, Reiad Chibah, Richard Cookson, Ruşen Güneş, Steve Wright (15), Sue Dench, Vicci Wardman
- Viola da Gamba – Richard Boothby
- Violin – Bea Lovejoy, Boguslaw Kostecki, Chris Tombling, Corinne Chapelle, Debbie Preece, Debbie Widdup, Dorina Markoff, Duncan Riddell, Everton Nelson, Gaby Lester, Ian Humphries, Jenny Godson, John Bradbury, Jonathan Evans-Jones, Jonathan Strange, Julian Leaper, Lorraine McAslan, Maciej Rakowski, Mark Berrow, Martin Burgess, Natalia Bonner, Patrick Kiernan, Paul Willey, Perry Montague-Mason, Peter Hanson, Philippa Ibbotson, Philippe Honoré, Rita Manning, Roger Garland, Sonia Slany, Steve Morris, Thomas Bowes, Tom Hankey, Tom Pigott-Smith

Vocalists

- Alto – Alexandra Gibson, Catherine Backhouse, Clara Sanabras, Deryn Edwards, Heather Cairncross, Jo Marshall, Judy Rees, Tamsin Dalley
- Bass – Benjamin Bevan, Cheyney Kent, John Evanson, Jonathan Wood, Lawrence Wallington, Michael Dore, Nicholas Garrett, Nigel Short, Patrick Ardagh-Walter, Richard Fallas, Russell Matthews, Stefan Berkieta
- Soprano – Cheryl Enever, Christina Sampson, Jacqueline Barron, Jenni Harper, Joanna Forbes-Lestrange, Joanna Goldsmith, Karen Ashby, Katie Trethewey, Natalie Clifton-Griffith, Prudence Sanders, Rosalind Waters, Ruth Kerr
- Tenor – Benedict Hymas, Garth Bardsley, Matthew Howard, Matt Long, Peter Wilman, Richard E. Wilson, Richard Eteson, Rory O'Connor
- Solo vocalist – Sunna Wehrmeijer

Orchestra

- Orchestration – Jeff Atmajian, John Ashton Thomas, Jon Kull, Pete Anthony, Peter Bateman
- Leader – Thomas Bowes
- Conductor – Pete Anthony
- Contractor – Isobel Griffiths
- Assistant contractor – Jo Changer, Susie Gillis

Choir

- Choir – London Voices, Trinity Boys' Choir
- Choirmaster – Ben Parry, Terry Edwards (London Voices), David Swinson (Boys' Choir)
- Lead vocalists – Amiri Harewood, Andrew Sinclair-Knopp, Benedict Hill, Benjamin Withnells, Charles Davies, Daniel Gilbert, Daniel Le Maitre-George, Daniel Williams, Graham Bass, Harry Cookson, Harry Lees, Igor Sterner, Joel Okolo-Hunter, Joshua Dumbrill, Joshua Kenney, Owen Davis, Quentin-Zach Martins, Roman Southcombe, Sebastian Davies, Sebastian Exall, William Gardner, William Stone

Management

- Director of music business affairs – Karen Sidlow
- Executive vice president of music business affairs – Lenny Wohl
- Executive in charge of film music – Carter Armstrong, Rona Rapadas
- Music management executive – Trevon Kezios, Ally Wigmore
- Film music coordinator – Nikki Triplett, Ryan Svendsen
- Music budget supervisor – Chris Brown

Design

- Package design – Jessica Kelly
- Photography – Tim Palen
- Liner notes – Francis Lawrence
