= The Hunger Games: Mockingjay – Part 2 (soundtrack) =

The Hunger Games: Mockingjay – Part 2 (Original Motion Picture Soundtrack)

Film score by James Newton Howard
- Released: November 23, 2015
- Studios: Abbey Road Studios, London
- Genre: Film score
- Length: 60:13
- Label: Republic
- Producer: James Newton Howard

James Newton Howard film score chronology
Pawn Sacrifice (2015)	The Hunger Games: Mockingjay – Part 1 (2015)	Concussion (2015)

The Hunger Games: Mockingjay – Part 2 (Original Motion Picture Soundtrack) is the soundtrack album to the 2015 film The Hunger Games: Mockingjay – Part 2. The film is scored by the recurring franchise collaborator James Newton Howard. It was released on November 23, 2015, through Republic Records, complimenting Howard's original score and the song "Deep in the Meadow" performed by Jennifer Lawrence that originally appeared in the predecessor, and again re-appeared in the film's end credits. In the album, it is accompanied by two suite pieces: "There Are Worse Games to Play" and the Hunger Games suite as a medley. A remixed version of the song, produced by Baauer was later unveiled separately. Unlike the predecessors, there is no additional pop companion album inspired by the film.

== Track listing ==
No.	Title	Length
1.	"Prim Visits Peeta"	1:25
2.	"Send Me to District 2"	2:09
3.	"Go Ahead, Shoot Me"	4:58
4.	"Stowaway"	3:36
5.	"Your Favorite Color is Green"	2:25
6.	"Transfer Command"	8:31
7.	"Your Next Step"	2:30
8.	"The Holo"	3:46
9.	"Sewer Attack"	8:00
10.	"I Made It Up"	1:28
11.	"Mandatory Evacuation"	3:14
12.	"Rebels Attack"	5:17
13.	"Snow's Mansion"	5:16
14.	"Symbolic Hunger Games"	2:08
15.	"Snow's Execution"	1:57
16.	"Plutarch's Letter"	3:01
17.	"Buttercup"	1:09
18.	"Primrose"	3:16
19.	"There Are Worse Games to Play/Deep in the Meadow/The Hunger Games Suite" (featuring Jennifer Lawrence)	9:41
Total length:		60:13

== Reception ==
Filmtracks.com commented that Howard's music for The Hunger Games series started with lament in the first instalment, drama in the second and expanded to full action in the third instalment, with the score for Mockingjay – Part 2 "meanders between all three in this entry". The review, although concerned with the highlights emulating Howard's score for The Last Airbender (2010), complimented that it provides a "noble send-off" to the musical franchise giving four stars to the album. Marcy Donelson of AllMusic commented the score as "quietly tense, wistful, and explosive".

Richard Lawson of Vanity Fair called the score as "alternately piercing and rousing", while John Anderson of Time called the score as "moody". Peter Debruge of Variety wrote Howard's score fluctuates from "soap-opera-style piano accents to full-blown action-movie bombast" while at moments becomes downright vital at the "film's claustrophobic sequence" where Katniss' squad battles head-to-head with the mutants at sewer system.

== Personnel credits ==
Credits adapted from CD liner notes:

- Music composer and producer – James Newton Howard
- Co-producer – Jim Weidman, Sven Faulconer
- Engineer – Johnny Traunwieser
- Additional arrangements – Sven Faulconer
- Synth programming – Sven Faulconer, Christopher Wray
- Recording – Shawn Murphy
- Mixing – Erik Swanson, Shawn Murphy
- Mastering – Dave Collins
- Music editor – David Olson
- Supervising music editor – Jim Weidman
- Score editor – David Channing
- Assistant score editor – Carlos Mosquera
- Auricle control systems – Chris Cozens, Richard Grant
- Music co-ordinator – Rona Rapadas
- Scoring co-ordinator – Pamela Sollie
- Creative director – Giancarlo Pacheco, Sandra Brummels
- Scoring crew – George Oulton, Jon Alexander, Lewis Jones, Matt Jones
- Music preparation – Joann Kane Music Service
- Music librarian – Mark Graham
- Packaging and design – Jessica Kelly

Instruments

- Bass – Allen Walley, Mary Scully, Richard Pryce, Roger Linley, Steve Williams, Steve Mair
- Bassoon, contrabassoon – Gavin McNaughton, Richard Skinner
- Cello – Bozidar Vukotic, Chris Worsey, Dave Daniels, Dave Lale, Frank Schaefer, Ian Burdge, Joely Koos, Jonathan Williams, Josephine Knight, Nick Cooper, Paul Kegg, Tim Gill, Tony Lewis, Richard Tunnicliffe (baroque)
- Clarinet, bass clarinet – Anthony Pike, David Fuest, Nick Rodwell
- Fiddle – Giles Lewin, Sonia Slany (solo)
- Flute – Anna Noakes, Helen Keen, Karen Jones
- Harp – Skaila Kanga
- Horn – David Pyatt, Martin Owen, Mike Thompson, Nigel Black, Phillip Eastop, Richard Bissill, Simon Rayner
- Oboe, cor anglais – Jane Marshall, John Anderson
- Percussion – Chris Baron, Frank Ricotti, Gary Kettel, Paul Clarvis, Bill Lockhart
- Piano, celesta – Simon Chamberlain
- Trombone – Andy Wood, Dave Stewart, Dudley Bright, Ed Tarrant, Emma Hodgson, Keith McNicoll, Mark Nightingale, Richard Edwards, Tracy Holloway
- Trumpet – Alistair Mackie, Andrew Crowley, Jason Evans, John Barclay, Kate Moore, Phil Cobb
- Tuba – Adrian Miotti, Owen Slade, Pete Smith
- Viola – Andy Parker, Clare Finnimore, Fiona Bonds, Gustav Clarkson, Jonathan Barritt, Judith Busbridge, Julia Knight, Kate Musker, Martin Humby, Morgan Goff, Peter Lale, Phil D'Arcy, Rebecca Carrington, Reiad Chibah, Richard Cookson, Rusen Gunes, Steve Tees, Sue Dench, Vicci Wardman
- Viola da Gamba – Richard Boothby
- Violin – Ben Cruft, Ben Hancox, Boguslaw Kostecki, Cathy Thompson, Chris Tombling, Dai Emanuel, Debbie Preece, Debbie Widdup, Dorina Markoff, Emlyn Singleton, Everton Nelson, Ian Humphries, Jackie Hartley, Jenny Godson, John Bradbury, Jonathan Evans-Jones, Jonathan Strange, Kathy Gowers, Lorraine McAslan, Maciej Rakowski, Martin Burgess, Oli Langford, Patrick Kiernan, Paul Willey, Perry Montague-Mason, Philippa Ibbotson, Philippe Honoré, Roger Garland, Sonia Slany, Steve Morris, Thomas Bowes, Tom Hankey, Tom Pigott-Smith

Vocals

- Alto – Alexandra Gibson, Amanda Dean, Carris Jones, Deryn Edwards, Freya Jacklin, Helen Brookes, Judith Rees, Susan Marrs, Tamsin Dalley, Vanessa Heine
- Bass – Ben Bevan, Edward Grint, James Holliday, John Evanson, Mark Williams, Neil Bellingham, Nicholas Garrett, Nigel Short, Oliver Hunt, Richard Fallas, Stefan Berkieta
- Soprano – Alison Hill, Amy Wood, Elizabeth Drury, Grace Davidson, Joanna Eteson, Joanna Forbes-Lestrange, Katie Hill, Natalie Clifton-Griffith, Rosalind Waters, Sara Brimer
- Tenor – Benedict Hymas, Benedict Quirke, Gabriel Vick, Harvey Brough, Julian Alexander Smith, Matt Long, Oliver Griffith, Peter Wilman, Richard Edgar Wilson, Richard Eteson
- Solo vocalist – Sunna Wehrmeijer

Choir

- Choir – London Voices, Trinity Boys Choir
- Choirmasters – David Swinson (Boys choir), Ben Parry, Terry Edwards (London Voices)
- Vocals – Alex MacTavish, Buster Dickinson, Daniel Gilbert, Daniel Williams, Erwan Regy, Freddie Jemison, Harry Cookson, Harry Lees, Igor Sterner, Joel Okolo-Hunter, Joshua Dumbrill, Max Sherwood, Ming-Ho Cheung, Roman Southcombe, Ross Ah-Weng, Samuel Richardson, Tom Leigh, William Stone, Zach Figuiera (Boys choir)

Orchestra

- Orchestration – Jeff Atmajian, John Ashton Thomas, Jon Kull, Pete Anthony, Peter Bateman, Peter Boyer
- Conductor – Pete Anthony
- Assistant orchestra contractor – Susie Gillis
- Orchestra contractor – Isobel Griffiths
- Orchestra leader – Thomas Bowes

Management

- A&R – Tom Mackay
- A&R administration – Gillian Russell
- A&R coordinator – Angela Asistio
- Business affairs – Evan Levane, Michael Seltzer, Skyler Sourifman
- Executive director of music business and legal affairs (Lionsgate) – Raha Johartchi
- Executive in charge of film music (Lionsgate) – Amy Dunning
- General manager, executive vice president of music business and legal affairs (Lionsgate) – Lenny Wohl
- Manager of film music (Lionsgate) – Nikki Triplett
- Marketing – Frank Arigo
- Music finance executive (Lionsgate) – Chris Brown
- Vice president of film music (Lionsgate) – Trevon Kezios
- Legal co-ordinator – Samantha Hilscher
- Senior co-ordinator of film music (Lionsgate) – Ryan Svendsen
- Production (Republic Records) – Cara Walker
