= Music of Alabama =

Alabama has played a central role in the development of both blues and country music. Appalachian folk music, fiddle music, gospel, spirituals, and polka have had local scenes in parts of Alabama. The Tuskegee Institute's School of Music (established 1931), especially the Tuskegee Choir, is an internationally renowned institution. There are three major modern orchestras, the Mobile Symphony, the Alabama Symphony Orchestra and the Huntsville Symphony Orchestra; the last is the oldest continuously operating professional orchestra in the state, giving its first performance in 1955.

== State song ==
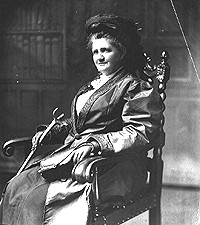
Julia Tutwiler, an advocate for education and prison reform, wrote the state song, "Alabama".

The state song of Alabama is entitled "Alabama". It was written by Julia Tutwiler and composed by Edna Gockel Gussen. It was adopted as the state song in 1931.

A State Senate bill (SB-458) was passed 32–1 in 2000 to move "Alabama" to the status of State Anthem, with "Stars Fell On Alabama", a song written in 1933 whose most popular release was by Jimmy Buffett in 1972 becoming the new State Song, and "My Home's in Alabama" (1980) by the Country group Alabama would become the State Ballad, but the bill failed in the State House.

Other grass roots efforts to make "Sweet Home Alabama" (1974) by Lynyrd Skynyrd the state song have also failed, but the song's potential official status made a comeback when the State Tourism Agency chose the song as the centerpiece of its 2008 marketing campaign.

== Recording studios ==
Muscle Shoals, Alabama is renowned worldwide as one of the epicenters of the music industry, having been the birthplace of a number of classic recordings. The studios of the Muscle Shoals area (Florence, Sheffield, Muscle Shoals, and Tuscumbia) figure prominently in the history of rock, country and R&B through the 1960s, 70s & 80s. FAME Studios, Muscle Shoals Sound Studios, Wishbone Studios, Quinvy Studios, East Avalon Recorders/ClearDay Studio, and others have recorded local musicians and international superstars alike. Notable artists have included Aretha Franklin, Rolling Stones, Lynyrd Skynyrd, Otis Redding, Wilson Pickett, Bob Dylan, Paul Simon, Rod Stewart, Willie Nelson, Hank Williams Jr, Roy Orbison, and countless others have recorded there. The notable studio house bands include The Muscle Shoals Rhythm Section, The Swampers, The Muscle Shoals Horns, and The Fame Gang.

Though not as popular a recording center as before, Muscle Shoals continues to be an important contributor to American popular music and is home to a number of the world's most successful songwriters, musicians and producers. Single Lock Records currently operates a recording studio, record label, and performance venue in the area.

The Hangout Music Festival (est. 2010) is an annual 3-day music festival held at the public beaches of Gulf Shores, Alabama.

== Halls of fame ==
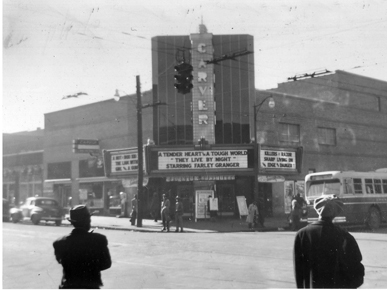
The historic Carver Theatre today houses the Jazz Hall of Fame

The Alabama Music Hall of Fame was created by the Alabama state legislature as a state agency in 1980. A 12,500 square foot (1,200 m²) exhibit hall opened in Tuscumbia in 1990.

The Alabama Jazz Hall of Fame (AJHoF) is located in Birmingham, housed in the historic Carver Theatre. It was founded in 1978 and opened a museum in 1993.

== Styles of music ==
=== Soul/R&B ===
Many artists in the realms of rhythm and blues and soul music have emerged from Alabama over the past 50 years, including Wilson Pickett, Percy Sledge, Martha Reeves of Martha and the Vandellas. Rick Hall established FAME Studios. In 1966, Rick Hall helped license Percy Sledge's "When a Man Loves a Woman", produced by Quin Ivy, to Atlantic Records, which then led to a regular arrangement under which Atlantic would send musicians to Hall's Muscle Shoals studio to record. The studio produced further hit records for Wilson Pickett, James & Bobby Purify, Aretha Franklin, Clarence Carter, Arthur Conley, and Otis Redding enhancing Hall's reputation as a white Southern producer who could produce and engineer hits for black Southern soul singers. He produced many sessions using guitarist Duane Allman. Dan Penn and Spooner Oldham wrote "I'm Your Puppet" for James & Bobby Purify. Members of The Commodores are from Tuskegee.

=== Rock/Pop ===
Rock and pop musicians from Alabama are Southern rock/pop/R&B band Wet Willie, the rock band Brother Cane, the power pop band Hotel of Birmingham, Bill McCorvey of the country band Pirates of the Mississippi, songwriter/producer Walt Aldridge, and Tommy Shaw of the rock band Styx. Dan Penn, from Alabama, worked with the Box Tops. The Birmingham area has had more than its fair share of American Idol contestants do well, including second season winner Ruben Studdard (who played football for Alabama A&M University).

=== Blues and Jazz ===
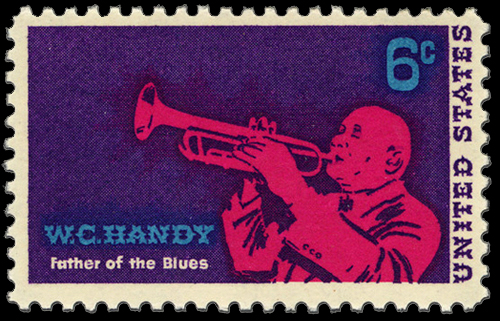
A stamp commemorating W.C. Handy, considered by many the "father of the blues"

WC Handy, often referred to as the "father of the blues", was born and raised in Florence, Alabama, which since 1982 holds an annual WC Handy Music Festival "to preserve, present, and promote the musical heritage of Northwest Alabama". The festival is usually held in the summer, and cake and other foods are typically served.

Piedmont and country blues singer, guitarist, and songwriter Ed Bell was born near Fort Deposit.

Though born in Frayser, a community in North Memphis, Tennessee, Johnny Shines, Blues singer and guitarist, moved to Holt, Alabama, in Tuscaloosa County, in 1969, where he lived until he died. Shines died on April 20, 1992, in Tuscaloosa, Alabama.[1] He was inducted into the Blues Hall of Fame later the same year.

Alabama has a rich jazz heritage, being the birthplace of such greats as Erskine Hawkins, Nat King Cole, Cleveland Eaton, James Reese Europe, Cootie Williams, William Manuel Johnson, Urbie Green, Ward Swingle, Cow Cow Davenport, members of Take 6 and many more. Tubist Howard Johnson of the Saturday Night Live band hails from Montgomery. The museum of the Alabama Jazz Hall of Fame honors many of these fine musicians. In the 1930s and 40s, college dance bands, such as the Alabama Cavaliers, the Auburn Knights and the Bama State Collegians played an important role in the history of jazz in the South. Birmingham, Alabama boasts several active big bands, including the SuperJazz Big Band, the Joe Giattina Orchestra, the Night Flight Big Band and the Magic City Jazz Orchestra, founded and directed by Ray Reach. In addition, there is a world-class horn section, the Tuscaloosa Horns, comprising some of Alabama's finest jazz/soul/funk instrumentalists. Also the newest/youngest break out big band in Alabama which incorporates everything from Duke Ellington to Bob Marley; the New South Jazz Orchestra which prominently features the Tuscaloosa Horns and the composing/arranging skills of members of the Tuscaloosa Horns.

Ward Swingle, world-famous multiple Grammy Award-winning jazz vocal composer and pianist, hails from Mobile.

Birmingham contributed prominently to the history of jazz in America. It is the hometown of numerous influential jazz musicians, including bassist Cleveland Eaton, pianist and vocalist Ray Reach, guitarist Johnny Smith, trumpeter and bandleader Erskine Hawkins, trumpeter and arranger Tommy Stewart, trumpeter Nelson Williams, composer Hugh Martin, arranger Sammy Lowe, bandleader Sun Ra, vibraphonist and bandleader Lionel Hampton, singer and guitarist Odetta, John Propst (pianist for Pete Fountain and Boots Randolph) and many more. Historical areas such as Tuxedo Junction and the Fourth Avenue Historic District played an important role in the evolution of jazz in Birmingham and the United States.

=== Gospel ===
Gospel music has an especially long tradition in the state, among both the white and black populations. Given the strongly religious coloring of Alabama's population historically, the genre is one example of many shared phenomena between the historically segregated cultures of the state. The two traditions are, however, distinct, and entail key distinctions, with Southern gospel incorporating elements of bluegrass and country music more strongly than "black" gospel.

=== Celtic ===
The state also has a Celtic music scene, which has produced bands like Henri's Notions, After Class, and the Birmingham-based harpist Cynthia Douglass, as well as a number of piping bands and promotional Celtic organizations.

=== Sacred Harp ===
Alabama is the leading state for Sacred Harp singing. More annual singings are held in Alabama than in any other state. The Sacred Harp: Revised Cooper Edition, a version of The Sacred Harp used across the southern parts of Georgia, Alabama, Mississippi, and Texas, is published by the Sacred Harp Book Company of Samson, Alabama. The Sacred Harp/Shape Note Music and Cultural Center is located in Bessemer, Alabama.

=== Country, Bluegrass, and Old-time Music ===
The State of Alabama has a rich history in country, bluegrass and old-time music. The influence of Mississippi Delta blues to the west and the ancient sounds of Appalachian Folk Music to the north blend with native Jazz sounds to form a brand of country music with a unique Alabama flavor. "Country music may be recorded in Nashville, but it was born in the Heart of Dixie." (Will Vincent, Tall Pines Bluegrass).

North Alabama's contribution to bluegrass music over the years has been exceptional. From former "Bluegrass Boys" Rual Yarbrough and Jake Landers, mandolin virtuoso Hershel Sizemore, fiddling legend Al Lester and the incomparable Claire Lynch, to modern day country-star-turned-bluegrass artist Marty Raybon, the list goes on and on.

Probably one of the most well-known musicians to ever hail from Alabama is Hank Williams Sr., born in Georgiana. Hank's hits include "I'm So Lonesome I Could Cry", "Lost Highway" and "Jambalaya (On the Bayou)". Hank and his wife Audrey are both buried in Oakwood Cemetery in Montgomery where the Hank Williams Museum resides downtown. A section of Interstate 65 between Georgiana and Montgomery was commemorated the "Lost Highway" in memory of Williams in 1997.

Other notable residents include Jimmy Buffett, though born in Pascagoula, Mississippi, grew up in the Mobile area. Country star Tammy Wynette was born on the Mississippi/Alabama line. The Louvin Brothers were pioneers of tight harmony country and bluegrass vocalizations. Vern Gosdin is another influential country music legend who came from the state of Alabama. Emmylou Harris was born in Birmingham. Shenandoah from Muscle Shoals became major stars. The group Alabama from Fort Payne is often credited with bringing country music groups (as opposed to solo vocalists) into the mainstream, paving the way for the success of today's top country groups.

== Musicians from Alabama ==
=== Members of the Alabama Music Hall of Fame ===
- Alabama – Famous country band, based in Fort Payne. Hit "Feel So Right", "Mountain Music"
- Arthur Alexander – country-soul songwriter and singer, born in Sheffield
- Ernest Ashworth – country star and a member of the Grand Ole Opry for 44 years, known for his hit "Talk Back Trembling Lips", from Huntsville
- Blind Boys of Alabama – gospel group, based in Talladega
- Clarence Carter – blues and soul singer, musician, songwriter and record producer, born in Montgomery
- Nat King Cole – jazz and R&B musician/songwriter, born in Montgomery (d. 1965)
- The Commodores – soul/funk group formed in Tuskegee, had two number one Hot 100 hits, such as "Three Times a Lady" in 1978
- William Levi Dawson – composer, organizer of the Tuskegee School of Music, from Anniston
- Delmore Brothers – from Elkmont
- Cleveland Eaton – jazz bassist, veteran of the Count Basie Orchestra and the Ramsey Lewis Trio, from Birmingham
- James Reese Europe – ragtime and early jazz bandleader, arranger, and composer, born in Mobile
- Eddie Floyd – soul-R&B singer and songwriter, born in Montgomery
- Joe L. Frank – country music promoter from Mt. Rozell
- Donnie Fritts – R&B musician
- Donna Jean Godchaux – singer, best known for having been a member of the Grateful Dead from 1972 until 1979, born in Florence
- Rick Hall – record producer from Franklin County
- W.C. Handy – father of the blues, born in Florence
- Emmylou Harris – country singer/songwriter, born in Birmingham
- Erskine Hawkins – big band leader
- Jake Hess – gospel singer from Limestone County
- Sonny James – early country star, born in Hacklebug
- James Joiner – founder of Tune Recording Studio, songwriter, from Florence
- Jamey Johnson – singer, songwriter, and ACM and CMA award winner from Enterprise
- Buddy Killen – record producer and founder of Dial Records, executive at Tree Publishing
- Louvin Brothers – influential close harmony group, from Section
- Chuck Leavell – keyboardist, former member of the Allman Brothers Band, sideman for Eric Clapton and the Rolling Stones
- Eddie Levert – founding member of The O'Jays, born in Bessemer
- Rose Maddox – country singer-songwriter and fiddle player, who was the lead singer with the Maddox Brothers and Rose before a successful solo career, born in Boaz
- Muscle Shoals Rhythm Section – renowned studio band, consisting of Jimmy Johnson, guitar, Roger Hawkins, drums, David Hood, bass, and Barry Beckett, keyboards
- Jim Nabors – actor and singer of standards and gospel, born in Sylacauga, attended the University of Alabama
- Odetta – singer, actress, guitarist, lyricist, and a civil and human rights activist, born in Birmingham
- Spooner Oldham – songwriter & keyboardist, born in Centre
- Dan Penn – singer, songwriter & record producer, from Vernon
- Sam Phillips – founder of Sun Records, born in Florence
- Wilson Pickett – R&B star, born in Prattville
- Curly Putman – songwriter from Princeton
- Martha Reeves – Motown lead singer, born in Eufaula
- Lionel Richie – singer/songwriter, see also Commodores, born in Tuskegee, had five number one Hot 100 hits, including "All Night Long (All Night)" in 1983
- Jimmie Rodgers – early country star, born in Geiger (d. 1933)
- Tommy Shaw – guitarist, singer, songwriter, rock bands Damn Yankees and Styx. Born in Prattville
- Billy Sherrill – country producer, with 74 top 10 hits, born in Phil Campbell
- Percy Sledge – 1960s soul star, born in Leighton
- Candi Staton – singer-songwriter, born in Hanceville
- Sun Ra – jazz musician and composer, born in Birmingham
- The Temptations – four members: Eddie Kendricks (Union Springs), Paul Williams (Birmingham), Melvin Franklin (Montgomery), and Dennis Edwards (Fairfield)
- Dinah Washington – jazz and blues singer, born in Tuscaloosa
- Wet Willie – Southern rock band from Mobile
- Jerry Wexler – New Yorker with Atlantic Records, responsible for the rise of Muscle Shoals
- John T. "Fess" Whatley – music educator, worked with the Jazz Demons, the first jazz band in Birmingham
- Hank Williams – country music pioneer, born in Georgiana (d. 1953), buried in Montgomery
- Tammy Wynette – country singer, lived in Red Bay (d. 1998)

=== Other musicians from Alabama ===
- Act of Congress (music group) – band from Helena
- Alabama Shakes – band from Athens, had a number one Billboard 200 album Sound & Color in 2015
- Belle Adair – indie pop-rock band from Florence
- Bo Bice – runner-up, American Idol Season 4
- David Briggs – R&B musician, The Swampers
- Tony Brook – songwriter, from Luverne
- Brother Cane – alternative band, based in Birmingham
- Larry Byrom – rock guitarist, from Huntsville
- Jerry Carrigan – R&B drummer
- Nell Carter – Broadway and TV, born in Birmingham
- Course of Nature – alternative rock band from Enterprise
- Seaborn McDaniel Denson – Sacred Harp teacher and composer
- Thomas Jackson Denson – Sacred Harp teacher and composer
- The Dirty Clergy – garage rock/pop band from Marion County
- The Dexateens – rock band, originated out of Tuscaloosa
- Doe B – rapper from Montgomery
- Drive-By Truckers – southern rock band of Shoals-area natives
- Flo Milli - rapper from Mobile
- William Lee Golden – baritone singer with the country, white gospel, doo wop group The Oakridge Boys, lives in Brewton
- Riley Green - country singer/songwriter from Jacksonville
- Gucci Mane – rapper from Bessemer
- Ty Herndon – country singer, lives in Butler
- Taylor Hicks – winner, American Idol Season 5, had a number one Hot 100 hit with "Do I Make You Proud" in 2006
- Brent Hinds – singer/songwriter and guitarist, from Helena, of heavy metal band Mastodon
- Charlie Hodge – musician for Elvis Presley, member of the "Memphis Mafia", born in Decatur
- Lonnie Holley, artist and musician from Birmingham, Dust-to-Digital Records
- Adam Hood – singer/songwriter from Opelika
- David Hood - R&B musician
- Hotel – pop-rock band from Birmingham from 1973–1982, recorded 2 albums with MCA Records, some chart success; very popular regional act in their day
- The Immortal Lee County Killers – punk blues band from Auburn, 1999–2007
- Jason Isbell & the 400 Unit – an Americana band from Muscle Shoals, had a number four album on the Billboard 200 with The Nashville Sound in 2017
- Joe – born in Georgia, lived in Opelika, #1 hit "Stutter" ft. Mystikal (2001)
- Jamey Johnson – country musician, born Enterprise, Alabama, origin Montgomery
- Will Kimbrough – singer/songwriter, producer, guitarist, multi-instrumentalist, lived in Mobile
- Frederick Knight – R&B singer, songwriter and record producer, born in Birmingham
- Ella Langley - country singer/songwriter fron Hope Hull
- Marty Lott, a.k.a. "The Phantom" – rockabilly, born in Prichard
- Maddox Brothers and Rose – influential early country group, from Boaz
- Man or Astro-man? – surf rock revivalists, Auburn
- Maylene and the Sons of Disaster – Southern metal band based out of Birmingham
- Allison Moorer – Academy Award nominated country folk musician from Frankville
- Jessie Murph - pop singer, born in Clarksville, Tennessee, raised in Athens
- Tommy Oliver – pedal steel guitarist, lives in Tuscumbia
- Wayne Perkins – guitarist, singer, songwriter, Muscle Shoals studio musician, played on Rolling Stones album, from Birmingham
- Susanna Phillips – soprano, winner of the Metropolitan Opera's 2010 Beverly Sills Artist Award, born in Huntsville
- The Pierces – Catherine & Allison Pierce, singers from Birmingham
- Shane Porter – founder of the New South Jazz Orchestra, published composer/arranger, free-lance trumpeter, pianist, member of the Tuscaloosa Horns, from Tuscaloosa
- Mac Powell – founding member of Christian Rock band Third Day – born in Clanton
- Norbert Putnam – music producer
- Ray Reach – jazz pianist, from Birmingham
- The Red Clay Strays - country rock group from Mobile
- Rich Boy – rapper, real name Maurice Richards, born 1985 in Mobile
- Rush of Fools – alternative Christian band from Birmingham.
- Peggy Scott-Adams - R&B singer
- Sex Clark Five – strum and drum, alternative rock from Huntsville
- St. Paul & the Broken Bones – soul band from Birmingham
- State Line Mob – Southern rock, Country duo group, Florence & Muscle Shoals natives, 2008 Winners of 2 Muscle Shoals music awards for Best new artist & Best new country album of the year.
- Tommy Stewart – composer, arranger, pianist and trumpeter based in Birmingham
- Ruben Studdard – winner of American Idol, Born in Birmingham
- Tom Stufford – R&B record producer, co-founder of FAME Studios
- Take 6 – contemporary gospel group, from Huntsville
- Maria Taylor – singer from Birmingham
- Toni Tennille – half of 1970s hitmakers Captain & Tennille, born in Montgomery
- Willie Mae "Big Momma" Thornton – blues and R&B artist, born in Ariton
- Trust Company – rock band from Montgomery
- Drake White – from Hokes Bluff
- Waxahatchee – an indie music project by musician Katie Crutchfield from Birmingham
- John Paul White – alt-folk musician, former member of The Civil Wars, resides in Florence, Alabama
- Hank Williams Jr. – famous country musician, born in Louisiana, lived in Cullman, Alabama
- Yelawolf – (Michael Wayne Atha) rapper and singer-songwriter from Gadsden

Matt Patton—-bassist for The Dexateens & The Drive By Truckers. Member of rock band Model Citizen. From Jasper.

== See also ==
- List of songs about Alabama
- List of songs about Birmingham, Alabama
- Quin Ivy
- Quinton Claunch
- WLAY (AM)
