= Italian Ice (album) =

Studio album by Nicole Atkins
- Released: May 29, 2020
- Length: 41:25
- Label: Single Lock
- Producer: Ben Tanner & Nicole Atkins

Nicole Atkins chronology
Goodnight Rhonda Lee (2017)	Italian Ice (2020)

Italian Ice is the fifth studio album by American singer-songwriter Nicole Atkins. It was released on May 29, 2020 under Single Lock Records.

The album features collaborations by Binky Griptite, Britt Daniel, David Hood, McKenzie Smith and Jim Sclavunos.

== Critical reception ==
Professional ratings
Aggregate scores
Source	Rating
Metacritic	78/100
Review scores
Source	Rating
AllMusic	4/5 stars
American Songwriter	4.5/5 stars
The Line of Best Fit	8/10
MusicOMH	3/5 stars
Sputnikmusic	4/5 stars
Under the Radar	8/10

Italian Ice was met with generally favorable reviews from critics. At Metacritic, which assigns a weighted average rating out of 100 to reviews from mainstream publications, this release received an average score of 78, based on 8 reviews.

Hal Horowitz of American Songwriter wrote, "This flawlessly conceived follow-up draws from many of the same influences yet broadens her boundaries. It's every bit as potent and expertly arranged, putting it in play as an early contender for one of 2020's finest albums." Sowing of Sputnikmusic said, "Italian Ice is the product of a talented pool of contributors who simultaneously lift Atkins up while still allowing her tremendous vocals to remain the focal point. It's the strongest album that Nicole has put forth – a gem that hopefully will not go overlooked." Marcy Donelson of AllMusic wrote, "It's an eclectic set, for sure, but loyal to a nostalgic musicality that doesn't take itself too seriously; there's a bit of a wink and smile to Italian Ice that adds an extra layer of charm." Haydon Spenceley of Under the Radar said, "The whole album is stuffed with hooks and brilliant ideas. This is peak Nicole Atkins."

Conversely, Ross Horton of MusicOMH called it "a flawless yet anonymous pop-soul record that may as well not have had such an extensive guest list."

== Track listing ==
Italian Ice track listing
No.	Title	Length
1.	"AM Gold"	4:34
2.	"Mind Eraser"	4:06
3.	"Domino"	4:03
4.	"Forever"	3:56
5.	"Captain" (featuring Britt Daniel)	3:07
6.	"Never Going Home Again" (featuring Erin Rae, John Paul White and Seth Avett)	3:07
7.	"St. Dymphna"	3:22
8.	"Far from Home"	4:11
9.	"A Road to Nowhere"	4:14
10.	"These Old Roses"	2:52
11.	"In the Splinters"	3:52
