= Belle Adair =

Belle Adair may refer to:

- Belle Adair (band)
- Belle Adair (actress)
