= Al Gamble =

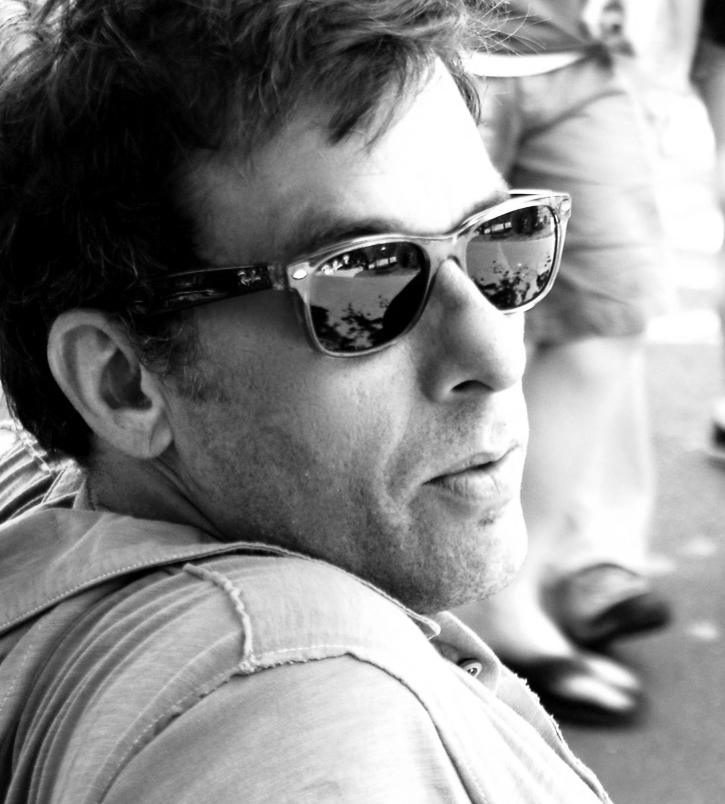
- Al Gamble in Memphis (2011)

Background information
- Also known as: Al Gamble
- Born: John Allen Gamble Jr. March 11, 1969 (age 57); Columbus, Georgia, United States
- Genres: Soul, R&B, rock, pop
- Instruments: Hammond B-3 organ, piano, clavinet, Wurlitzer
- Years active: 1987-present

John Allen "Al" Gamble (born March 11, 1969) is an American, Memphis, Tennessee and Birmingham, Alabama based, session musician, playing Hammond B-3 organ and keyboards. He is currently the keyboard player for St. Paul and The Broken Bones.

== Early life ==
Gamble was born in Columbus, Georgia, United States, but his family moved to his parents' home town of Tuscumbia, Alabama (near Muscle Shoals), where he was raised. After graduating from the University of Alabama in 1991 he lived in Tuscumbia, until moving to Memphis in 1994 to pursue a career in music.

== Career ==
Gamble grew up listening to his father's record collection, which included Jimmy Smith, Ray Charles, Jack McDuff and other jazz and soul artists on the Verve and Blue Note labels. He played in various bands during high school and college, and in 1992 joined the Shreveport-based Bluebirds, featuring Buddy Flett on guitar. Gamble spent a few years in Memphis as a Beale Street musician, backing such artists as Preston Shannon and A-440. In 2001, he formed the Gamble Brothers Band with his younger brother Chad Gamble (drums), Art Edmaiston (saxophone) and Will Lowrimore (bass). The band recorded three albums from 2001 to 2007. The first album, 10 Lbs. of Hum (2001), was released independently and featured Lowrimore on bass. The last two albums, Back to the Bottom (2003) and Continuator (2006), were released on the Memphis-based label Archer Records. Back to the Bottom was the last recording to feature Lowrimore on bass, who left the band shortly after the album's release. Continuator featured bassist, Blake Rhea, who joined the band in 2003 to replace Lowrimore.

In 2003, the Gamble Brothers Band beat out more than 1,200 other artists to win the Billboard-sponsored Independent Music World Series award.

Edmaiston joined the Jacksonville-based touring band JJ Grey & MOFRO in 2007, and soon after that, the Gamble Brothers Band played a show opening for the Black Crowes in October 2007 at Mud Island Amphitheatre in Memphis, their final live performance for 12 years. The band reunited for a show at the Crosstown Theater in Memphis on December 21, 2019. Earlier in 2007, while Edmaiston was on a break from touring, he joined Gamble, Memphis guitar player Joe Restivo, and drummer George Sluppick to form The Grip, a four-piece jazz instrumental band specializing in boogaloo music. The Grip recorded the EP Grab This Thing for Archer Records (2007).

The road took Edmaiston away again, and Gamble continued to play with Restivo and Sluppick as a three-piece, forming the band The City Champs. The City Champs released two albums on Scott Bomar's Electraphonic label: The Safecracker (2009) and The Set Up (2010). The City Champs have toured regularly and opened for other acts, including the North Mississippi Allstars and Huey Lewis. The members' other musical projects took them in different directions, but after a long hiatus they reunited to create the critically acclaimed Luna '68, released in 2021 on Big Legal Mess Records.

The City Champs' music has been featured in the MTV series "$5 Cover" and in the Emmy Award-winning documentary film I Am A Man: From Memphis, A Lesson in Life.

On November 29, 2010, The City Champs took part in the filming of a new Memphis music documentary. Titled Take Me To The River, this Cody Dickinson/Martin Shore-produced film, released Sept. 12, 2014, showcases icons of the Memphis' music scene playing with up-and-coming young bands. The City Champs collaborated with harmonica legend Charlie Musselwhite and Muscle Shoals Rhythm Section bassist David Hood on bass to film a segment at Electraphonic Studios in Memphis. The film, which includes contributions from Terrance Howard and Snoop Dogg, was honored at the Raindance Film Festival awards ceremony in London as the Feature Film.

In January 2013, after learning about St. Paul and The Broken Bones from friend and guitarist Browan Lollar, Gamble was asked to add organ overdubs on the band's debut album Half The City, recorded in Muscle Shoals, Alabama. Later that year, Gamble joined the band full-time, prior to the release of the record in February 2014. St. Paul and The Broken Bones have toured extensively in the United States and Europe and opened two shows (June 9 in Atlanta; and July 11 in Buffalo, New York) for The Rolling Stones on the band's 2015 Zip Code Tour. In January 2016, St. Paul and the Broken Bones played a sold-out Carnegie Hall show as part of a four-concert series curated by Rosanne Cash called Carnegie Hall's Perspectives.

In February 2017, St. Paul and the Broken Bones headlined the Elton John AIDS Foundation Academy Awards viewing party in West Hollywood, California.

Gamble has recorded on more than 50 albums and on various film scores. He is credited with writing or co-writing more than 120 songs, according to BMI. He has toured with The City Champs, singer/songwriter Charlie Mars, John Paul Keith and the 145s, Louisiana soul singer Marc Broussard, Charles Walker and the Dynamites, The Bo-Keys, and St. Paul and The Broken Bones.

== Personal life ==
Al Gamble currently lives in Memphis, Tennessee.

== Alabama Music Hall of Fame ==
Al Gamble and his brother Chad are listed as "Music Achievers" in the Alabama Music Hall of Fame.

== Discography ==
Year	Album details
1995	Alex Chilton - A Man Called Destruction: Released: 1995; Label: Ardent Records; Songs: Sick and Tired, Devil Girl, Lies, It's Your Funeral, You're Lookin' Good, Don't Know Anymore
1995	Pat Ramsey - It's About Time: Released: 1995; Label: Rampat Records
1995	Lucille - Lucille: Released: 1995; Label: Blues Works Records; Songs: Saucey
1996	The Bluebirds - South from Memphis: Released: 1996; Label: Icehouse Records
1998	Larry Garner - Standing Room Only: Released: 1998; Label: Ruf Records
1998	Junkyardmen - Scrapheap Full of Blues: Released: 1998; Label: Inside Memphis
1998	Jimmy Thackery and the Drivers - Switching Gears: Released: 1998; Label: Blind Pig Records; Songs: Monkey, I Got to Be Strong
1998	Whitebread featuring Carlos Ecos - Everybody Wants: Released: 1998; Label: Nustar Entertainment
1999	"Big" Bill Morganfield - Nineteen Years Old (A Tribute To Muddy Waters): Released: 1999; Label: Taxim Records; Songs: Why Do People Act Like This, Caldonia, Child of Mercy
2001	Gamble Brothers Band - 10 lbs. of Hum: Released: 2001; Produced by: Keith Sykes; Songs: Blue Beat Years, Bring 'em Back, Don't Turn Your Burner Down, Everything I Do, The Booster, City in the Sky, Numbers Never Lie, What's Wrong Now, Point the Finger, Don't Do It, You Gotta Be Kiddin'
2001	Deborah Coleman - Livin' on Love: Released: 2001; Label: Blind Pig Records; Songs: Livin' on Love
2002	Rufus Thomas - Live in Porretta: Released: 2002; Label: Soul Dispenser; Songs: The World is Round
2003	Gamble Brothers Band - Back to The Bottom: Released: Sept. 2, 2003; Produced by: Ross Rice; Label: Archer Records; Songs: Record Store, Back to the Bottom, Love is Alive, Share, Tiki Bar, Come on Sam, One Stone, Escape Alley, Old New One, Land of Soul, Little Criminals, Cadillactopus
2003	Ana Popovic - Comfort to the Soul: Released: 2003; Label: Blind Pig Records; Songs: Love Me Again
2003	Jimmy Thackery - Guitar: Released: 2003; Label: Ruf Records; Songs: Roy's Bluz
2005	Mike McClure Band - Camelot Falling: Released: 2005; Label: Smith Entertainment
2006	Gamble Brothers Band - Continuator: Released: Feb. 21, 2006; Produced by: Jeff Powell; Label: Archer Records; Songs: Overboard, Hold Out 'Til Monday, Back to School, E. Parkway Rundown, Heart's Not In It, Right Direction, Vinyl, Durty Walt, Shopping Cart, Theme From "Little Champ," Threw it All Away, All Skate, Best Defense
2007	The Grip - Grab This Thing: Released: 2007; Label: Archer Records; Songs: Grab This Thing, Jan Jan, Tutwiler, Controversy, Farewell to Cheyenne
2009	The City Champs - The Safecracker: Released: March 17, 2009; Label: Electraphonic Recording; Songs: The Safecracker, Takin' State, Love is a Losing Game, Poppin', The Whap-A-Dang, Pretty Girl, Comin' Home Baby, You Can't Win, Four Score, Ol' Man River
2009	John Paul Keith and the 145s - Spills & Thrills: Released: April 14, 2009; Label: Big Legal Mess
2009	Jimbo Mathus - Jimmy the Kid: Released: Aug. 22, 2009; Label: Hill Country Records
2009	Zach Williams and the Reformation - Electric Revival: Released: 2009
2010	Sid Selvidge - I Should Be Blue: Released: June 8, 2010; Label: Archer Records; Songs: I'll Be Here in the Morning, Fine Hotel, A Blonde Headed Girl (In A Convertible Automobile), You're Gonna Look Just Like a Monkey (When You Get Old)
2010	The City Champs - The Set Up: Released: 2010; Label: Electraphonic Recording; Songs: The Set Up, Drippy, Ricky's Rant, Crump St., Chinatown, Rigamarole, Local Jones, Break It Up, A Beautiful Mine (Theme from Mad Men), Comanche, The Sanctimoneous Kid, Shishido Jo
2011	John Paul Keith and the 145s - The Man that Time Forgot: Released: June 21, 2011; Label: Big Legal Mess
2011	The Bo-Keys - Got to Get Back!: Released: 2011; Label: Electraphonic Recording
2011	The Scruffs - Kill! Kill!: Released: 2011; Label: Scruffsville; Songs: Take Me Downtown
2012	Jeb Rault Band - Sweet Dancer: Released: Mar. 2012
2013	The Yellow Hope Project - Fifty Shades of Yellow: Released: May 12, 2013; Songs: Could You Find It in Your Heart to Love Me?
2013	John Paul Keith and the 145s - Memphis Circa 3AM: Released: Sept. 17, 2013; Label: Big Legal Mess; Songs: You Really Oughta Be with Me, We Got All Night, Everything's Different Now, Ninety Proof Kiss, Walking Along the Lane, True Hard Money, New Year's Eve, There's a Heartache Going 'Round, If You Catch Me Staring, Last Night I Had a Dream About You, She's Almost You, Baby We're a Bad Idea
2014	Jesse Aycock - Flowers and Wounds: Released: Jan. 21, 2014; Label: Horton Records; Songs: Out to Space, Paint Me Different Colors, Flowers and Wounds
2014	St. Paul and the Broken Bones - Half the City: Released: Feb. 28, 2014; Label: Single Lock Records; Songs: Call Me, Half the City, Broken Bones and Pocket Change, Like a Mighty River, Don't Mean a Thing, Grass is Greener, I'm Torn Up, Dixie Rothco, Let it Be So, That Glow
2014	The Hold Steady - Teeth Dreams: Released: Mar. 25, 2014; Label: Washington Square/Razor & Tie
2014	John Nemeth - Memphis Grease: Released: Mar. 25, 2014; Label: Blue Corn Music
2014	You, Me & Apollo - Sweet Honey: Released: May 9, 2014; Label: Self Released; Songs: Trains (Feat. Al Gamble)
2014	Jimmy Thackery - Extra Jimmies: Released: Oct. 14, 2014; Label: Blind Pig Records; Songs: I Got to Be Strong, Monkey
2014	The Bo-Keys - Electraphonic Singles Vol. 1: Label: Electraphonic Recording
2014	Louise Hoffsten - Bringing Out the Elvis: Label: Warner Music Sweden
2015	Darren Hanlon - Where Did You Come From?: Released: Mar. 24, 2015; Label: Yep Roc Records; Songs: Trust Your Feelings (When You Wake)
2015	The Libras - Skies Are Grey: Released: Nov. 13, 2015
2016	The Bo-Keys - Heartaches By The Number: Released: April 29, 2016; Label: Electraphonic Records
2016	St. Paul and the Broken Bones - Sea of Noise: Released: Sept. 9, 2016; Label: Records; Songs: Crumbling Light Posts Pt. 1, Flow With It (You Got Me Feeling Like), Midnight on Earth, I'll Be Your Woman, All I Ever Wonder, Sanctify, Crumbling Light Posts Pt. 2, Waves, Brain Matter, Tears in the Diamond, Is It Me, Crumbling Light Posts Pt. 3
2016	Robert Finley - Age Don't Mean A Thing: Released: Sep. 30, 2016
2016	Jim Mize - Jim Mize: Released: Dec. 1, 2016; Label: Big Legal Mess Records
2017	Lauren Barth - Forager: Released: May 5, 2017; Label: Horton Records
2018	Nicki Bluhm - To Rise You Gotta Fall: Released: June 1, 2018; Label: Compass Records
2018	St. Paul and the Broken Bones - Young Sick Camellia: Released: Sept. 7, 2018; Label: ATO Records
2018	Al Green - Produced by Matt Ross-Spang (Amazon Original): Released: Sept. 13, 2018; Songs: Before the Next Teardrop Falls
2018	Drew Holcomb and the Neighbors - Good Light: Released: Dec. 10, 2018; Label: Magnolia Records
2019	Amy LaVere - Painting Blue: Released: Aug. 16, 2019; Label: Archer Records; Songs: No Battle Hymn, Not in Memphis
2019	Foy Vance - To Memphis: Released: Sept. 6, 2019; Label: Gingerbread Man Records
2020	St. Paul and the Broken Bones - Live from Wichita: Released: June 5, 2020
2020	Mark Edgar Stuart - Folk Beef: Released: July 14, 2020
2020	Don Bryant - You Make Me Feel: Released: June 19, 2020; Label: Fat Possum Records
2020	Daily Worker - Hometown Hero: Released: Dec. 1, 2020; Songs: I Got Hypnotized, Ghost (About This Place)
2020	Bailey Bigger - Let's Call It Love: Released: Dec. 4, 2020; Label: Big Legal Mess Records; Songs: Weight of Independence, Let's Call It Love
2021	John Paul Keith - The Rhythm of the City: Released: Feb. 19, 2021; Label: Wild Honey Records
2021	The City Champs - Luna '68: Released: Mar. 19, 2021; Label: Big Legal Mess Records
2021	Foy Vance - Signs of Life: Released: Sept. 10, 2021; Label: Gingerbread Man Records; Songs: People Are Pills, Resplendence
2021	Alexa Rose - Headwaters: Released: Sep. 17, 2021; Label: Big Legal Mess Records
2021	Gervin - Chance Music EP: Released: Dec. 2, 2021
2022	St. Paul and the Broken Bones - The Alien Coast: Released: Jan. 28, 2022; Label: ATO Records
2022	The Love Light Orchestra - Leave the Light On: Released: Feb. 18, 2022; Label: Nola Blue Records; Songs: 3 O'Clock Blues, After All, Follow the Queen
2022	Mark Edgar Stuart - Until We Meet Again: Released: Feb. 25, 2022; Label: Madjack Records
2022	Gervin - No. 10 Funk EP: Released: Feb. 28, 2022
2022	Dedicated Men of Zion - The Devil Don't Like It: Released: Mar. 4, 2022; Label: Bible & Tire Recording Company
2022	Nicki Blum - Avondale Drive: Released: June 3, 2022; Label: Little Knickers Records; Songs: Love to Spare, Mother's Daughter
2022	Elizabeth King - I Got A Love: Released: June 25, 2022; Label: Bible & Tire Recording Company; Songs: Stand By Me, Move A Little Higher, My Robe, My Time Ain't Long
2022	Gervin - Benchwarmer: Released: Sep. 2, 2022
2022	Herman Hitson - Let the Gods Sing: Released: Sep. 25, 2022; Label: Big Legal Mess Records
2023	Max Kaplan and the Magics - Mind on My Heart: Released: Mar. 24, 2023
2023	St. Paul and the Broken Bones - Angels in Science Fiction: Released: Apr. 21, 2023; Label: ATO Records
2025	St. Paul and the Broken Bones - St. Paul and the Broken Bone: Released: Oct. 10, 2025; Label: Oasis Pizza Records

== Television performances ==
- Lopez Tonight - w/Marc Broussard - June 13, 2011
- CBS This Morning: Saturday - w/St. Paul and the Broken Bones - March 28, 2014
- The Late Late Show with Craig Ferguson - w/St. Paul and the Broken Bones - April 28, 2014
- Jimmy Kimmel Live - w/St. Paul and the Broken Bones - June 23, 2014
- ACL Presents: Americana Music Festival 2014 - w/St. Paul and the Broken Bones - November 22, 2014
- Late Show with David Letterman - w/St. Paul and the Broken Bones - January 12, 2015
- Late Show with Stephen Colbert - w/St. Paul and the Broken Bones - August 30, 2016
- CBS This Morning: Saturday - w/St. Paul and the Broken Bones - Sept. 10, 2016
- CONAN on TBS - w/St. Paul and the Broken Bones - Sept. 19, 2016
- Later with Jools Holland - w/St. Paul and the Broken Bones - Oct. 21, 2016
- Bluegrass Underground, Season 6, Episode 11 - w/St. Paul and the Broken Bones - Nov. 16, 2016
- MTV Live Setlist, Season 1, Episode 4 - w/St. Paul and the Broken Bones - Jan. 7, 2017
- Austin City Limits, Season 42, Episode 12 - w/St. Paul and the Broken Bones - July 15, 2017
- Jimmy Kimmel Live - w/St. Paul and the Broken Bones - Sept. 10, 2018
- CBS This Morning: Saturday - w/St. Paul and the Broken Bones - Oct. 13, 2018
- Late Show with Stephen Colbert, Season 4, Episode 68 - w/St. Paul and the Broken Bones - Dec. 18, 2018
- Late Night with Seth Meyers, Episode 801 - w/St. Paul and the Broken Bones - Feb. 18, 2019
- CBS This Morning: Saturday - w/St. Paul and the Broken Bones - Jan. 4, 2020
- Late Show with Stephen Colbert - w/St. Paul and the Broken Bones - Jan. 27, 2022
- CBS This Morning: Saturday - w/St. Paul and the Broken Bones - Jan. 29, 2022
- Jimmy Kimmel Live - w/St. Paul and the Broken Bones - May 9, 2022
- The Tonight Show Starring Jimmy Fallon - w/St. Paul and the Broken Bones - Dec. 8, 2025
