= Goodnight Rhonda Lee =

Studio album by Nicole Atkins
- Released: July 21, 2017
- Studio: Niles City Sound (Fort Worth, Texas)
- Genre: Country; pop; soul
- Length: 39:44
- Label: Single Lock
- Producer: Niles City Sound

Nicole Atkins chronology
Slow Phaser (2014)	Goodnight Rhonda Lee (2017)	Italian Ice (2020)

Singles from Goodnight Rhonda Lee
- 1. "A Little Crazy" Released: October 20, 2016; 2. "Listen Up" Released: May 19, 2017; 3. "Darkness Falls So Quiet" Released: June 22, 2017; 4. "Brokedown Luck" Released: February 21, 2018

Goodnight Rhonda Lee is the fourth studio album by American musician Nicole Atkins. It was released in July 2017 under Single Lock Records.

== Background ==
Atkins released her third album Slow Phaser on February 4, 2014. It received positive reviews for its production and songwriting. To promote the album, Atkins spent the rest of 2014 touring across North America and Europe. In March 2017, Atkins announced that she was working on new material for her next album.

== Promotion ==
In March 2017, Atkins announced that along with the new record, she would go on a 22-city spring tour to promote Goodnight Rhonda Lee ahead of its release, starting on March 13 at the Shipping and Receiving Bar in Fort Worth, Texas, and finishing on June 17 at the Mountain Jam festival in Hunter Mountain. On February 21, 2018, Atkins announced a 14-city spring eastern U.S. tour, beginning on April 18 at the Saturn venue at Birmingham, Alabama, and ending on May 5 at the Bearsville Theater in Woodstock, New York. On December 18, Atkins announced an 18-city European tour, starting on April 4, 2019 at The Blue Arrow in Glasgow, and finishing on April 30 at The Lexington in Islington, London.

== Critical reception ==
Professional ratings
Aggregate scores
Source	Rating
Metacritic	83/100
Review scores
Source	Rating
AllMusic	4.5/5 stars
American Songwriter	4/5 stars
Drowned in Sound	8/10
Exclaim!	8/10
The Skinny	4/5 stars
Slant Magazine	4/5 stars
Under the Radar	7/10 stars

Goodnight Rhonda Lee received positive reviews from music critics. At Metacritic, which assigns a normalized rating out of 100 to reviews from mainstream critics, the album received an average score of 83, based on 9 reviews.

Marcy Donelson of AllMusic said, "Goodnight Rhonda Lee is hardly Atkins' first stylistic excursion into the past, but here, having an audibly sharp focus, a lot on her mind, and a leave-it-all-on-tape performance ethic make for her strongest impression since her debut." Peter Ellman of Exclaim! said, "Amid soulful, R&B-indebted sounds married smoothly to the more country-leaning, Atkins has created her best and most resounding work yet." Hal Horowitz of American Songwriter called it "a moving, intensely personal and wildly creative set that ranks as one of 2017's finest works", saying, "It might have taken three previous tries and introspective psychological searching to arrive here, but with Goodnight Rhonda Lee, Nicole Atkins gets all the pieces to fit." Josh Hurst of Slant Magazine said, "Everything on Goodnight Rhonda Lee is immediate. Throughout, Atkins's lyrics eschew metaphor in favor of a more confessional mode, and her arrangements are punchy and direct. She also revels equally in her high notes and in her little cracks and imperfections. At no point is there any doubt that this is the album she's always wanted to make." Nick Roseblade of Drowned in Sound said, "Goodnight Rhonda Lee never feels like a pastiche or a rip off of classic soul songs, but a celebration of the genre and life. Yes some songs could be trimmed a bit and maybe some of the motifs would be tighter, but overall this is an album by someone who knows exactly what she wants to say and how she wants to say it."

American Songwriter ranked Goodnight Rhonda Lee number 19 on their list of the Top 25 Albums of 2017. The magazine's writer Hal Horowitz said that Atkins "shifts to full chanteuse mode, mixing countrypolitan with a '60s, Phil Spector-styled approach that sounds like nothing else in contemporary music", calling it "a spectacularly original, compelling work that is exhilarating and timeless." Exclaim! ranked it number five on their list of the Top 10 Folk and Country Albums list. The magazine's writer Alan Ranta said that Atkins performs "songs that feature her greatest assets: her rich, classic voice and revelatory lyrics."

== Track listing ==
Goodnight Rhonda Lee track listing
No.	Title	Writer(s)	Length
1.	"A Little Crazy"	Nicole Atkins; Chris Isaak	3:46
2.	"Darkness Falls So Quiet"	Atkins	4:46
3.	"Listen Up"	Atkins; Vincent John; Ryan Spraker	3:10
4.	"Goodnight Rhonda Lee"	Atkins; Isaak	2:33
5.	"If I Could"	Atkins; Louise Goffin; Chris Seefried	3:24
6.	"Colors"	Atkins; David Michael Sherman	2:46
7.	"Brokedown Luck"	Atkins; Jim Sclavunos	3:43
8.	"I Love Living Here (Even When I Don't)"	Atkins; Sherman	3:32
9.	"Sleepwalking"	Atkins; Reno Bo	3:46
10.	"A Night of Serious Drinking"	Atkins; Sclavunos	4:10
11.	"A Dream Without Pain"	Atkins; Kenny Childers	4:08

== Personnel ==
Credits adapted from the album's liner notes.

Vocals

- Nicole Atkins – vocals
- Ele Chupik – backing vocals
- Khadijah Islah Mohanimes – backing vocals

Production

- Niles City Sound – mixing
- Ben Tanner – additional mixing
- Joe LaPorta – mastering (Sterling Sound)

Imagery

- Fetzer Design – album design
- Griffin Lotz – cover and gatefold photo
- Lucia Holm – edited cover photo
- Shervin Lainez – back cover photo

Instruments

- Nicole Atkins – horn arrangements, string arrangements
- Geoffrey Muller – bass guitar
- Robert Ellis – acoustic guitar, organ, piano
- Austin Jenkins – acoustic guitar, electric guitar
- Will Van Horn – baritone guitar, steel guitar, organ
- Kelly Doyle – electric guitar
- Sean Redman – violin
- Imelda Tecson – violin
- Buffi Jacobs – cello
- Leo Saenz – trumpet
- Jeff Dazey – saxophone

== Charts ==
Chart	Peak position
US Folk Albums (Billboard)	21
US Independent Albums (Billboard)	18
