= Neptune City (album) =

Studio album by Nicole Atkins
- Released: October 30, 2007
- Recorded: September, November 2006; Varispeed Studios, Kalgerup, Sweden; Gula Studion, Malmö, Sweden
- Genres: Chamber pop, country pop
- Label: Red Ink/Columbia
- Producer: Tore Johansson

Nicole Atkins chronology
Neptune City (2007)	Mondo Amore (2011)

Neptune City is an album by Nicole Atkins, released in the U.S. on October 30, 2007, by Columbia Records. The album reached No. 6 on Billboard's Top Heatseekers chart.

== Album title ==
Prior to the album's release, Atkins found herself at a bar her family frequented in Neptune City, New Jersey called Bilow's, thinking about what she would title her album. She pondered aloud naming the album Neptune City, almost as a counterbalance to Greetings from Asbury Park, N.J., with encouragement from the bar's patrons. "And I figured Neptune City, too, it seems so ominous," she told the Village Voice. "It sounds like very, you know, aquatic and mysterious." Though several publications have suggested the album's title refers directly to her hometown, the real life Neptune City is a distinct municipality just to the east of Atkins' native Neptune, New Jersey.

== Critical reception ==
Professional ratings
Review scores
Source	Rating
AbsolutePunk	(84%)
AllMusic	4.5/5 stars
BBC Music	(positive)
The Cornell Daily Sun	(positive)
Entertainment Weekly	(B+)
Music Emissions	4.5/5 stars
The New Zealand Herald	4/5 stars
PopMatters	8/10 stars
Spin	(6/10)
Under the Radar	(8.5/10)

Neptune City was generally well received by most music critics. Katherine Fulton of AllMusic noticed that "Atkins shows on this album that she has both the capability and potential" and praised the "lush arrangements on Neptune City, which [...] showcase the depth, range, and versatility of Atkins' alto voice, not to mention her songwriting prowess". Chris Jones of BBC Music wrote that Atkins "delivers glorious, over-the-top twang-drenched ballads that both romanticise her native New Jersey and yet still throw in a tough, dark heart of country noir" and described the album as "something akin to country, but also something weirdly post-modern", while praising its production and vocals. Susan Frances of AbsolutePunk wrote that "the whole album is tooled with melodic patterned frescos combining orchestral fields with pop/rock elements" and added that it "does justice to the real Neptune City". Mikael Wood from Entertainment Weekly described it as "heartbreak nearly at its finest — and most cosmopolitan" while Joanna Hunkin of The New Zealand Herald compared it to "an intricate oil painting" and called it "a collection of curiosities, revealing a new intrigue with every listen".

Michael Keefe of PopMatters found the album "big and dreamy", the arrangements "vibrant, lush, and propulsive", and stated that "the instrumentation will swoop in and carry you along for a 40-minute ride through timeless chamber pop", but also noted that "the primal force that drives Neptune City is the huge and charismatic voice of Nicole Atkins". Will Miller from Music Emissions noticed that Neptune City "deals with that love/hate relationship almost everybody has with their hometown" and wrote that "with varied and lush instrumentation of strings and piano, the musical backdrops are full and rich throughout" and generally praised Atkins' vocal abilities. Suzanne Baumgarten of The Cornell Daily Sun felt that Atkins "has a folk song quality that makes her otherwise pop-like style unique and truly enjoyable" and called the album "optimistic, yet utterly realistic", while Under the Radar called it "a superb yesteryear sounding album". The album also garnered positive reviews from independent entertainment website IndieLondon, which found it "well worth checking out", and Greek webzine Avopolis, which described it as "an elegy for love".

A fairly mixed review came from Stacey Anderson of Spin, who noticed that the artist "coolly distills the romanticism of '60s girl groups into dark, baleful country pop" but felt that "the songs swell and crest in identical structure, leaving her gorgeous voice [...] to battle the overproduction". Jenni Cole of MusicOMH gave an unfavorable review, saying that "this really is an album that's going nowhere".

== Track listing ==
All tracks are written by Nicole Atkins, except where noted.

No.	Title	Writer(s)	Length
1.	"Maybe Tonight"		3:16
2.	"Together We're Both Alone"		4:18
3.	"The Way It Is"		3:36
4.	"Cool Enough"		5:25
5.	"War Torn"		3:58
6.	"Love Surreal"	Atkins, Tore Johansson, Jens Lindgard, Martin Gjerstad	4:06
7.	"Neptune City"		3:56
8.	"Brooklyn's on Fire!"		3:51
9.	"Kill the Headlights"		3:19
10.	"Party's Over"		4:15
Total length:			39:68

=== Neptune City ===
The song is sung mainly from the perspective of a ghost or spirit, paying one last visit to his hometown before leaving forever to the next world.

It begins with the narrator identifying himself as a ghost looking down on his own funeral – “You can’t see me from this view, all the way down, trailing the procession.” He says he'll “hide out a few more days,” perhaps the mourning period for the remaining family, but then has to leave.

The narrator seems to wish he could have a more positive outlook on the “landscape I was born to,” ostensibly the same town where his funeral now takes place. He thinks if he looked at it differently, it could “make me new again.”

The chorus is divided between the narrator and the family left behind on Earth. In the first quatrain, the family's “hearts are singing out” for the deceased. They are so bereaved that they sing a “cemetery song”, but if they could figure out a way beyond their grief – “if we knew just what we could do” – they could stop singing the cemetery song.

The second quatrain finds the narrator assessing his current state, “sitting over Neptune City”, wistfully acknowledging how much he misses it. He has one chance to briefly return – “I’ll come down, walk around a while” – until his time is up and he's “sure [he] can never go home again."

In a 2007 interview with The Star-Ledger, Atkins indicated the last quatrain could also apply to anyone looking back with ambivalence at their hometown. “After the fact, it took on all these different meanings about not being able to feel comfortable in the place that you always thought was home.”

==== Background ====
Atkins told the Ledger, "I wasn't even planning on writing a song called 'Neptune City.' My sister and I were making pasta, and we were like, (sings) 'We're making pasta in Neptune City ...' Like, just kidding. And I was like, 'That (melody) sounds really cool.'" The lyrics were inspired by an uncle whom she never met. Long before Atkins' birth, her mother's brother died in an accident at the age of 13. Years later, Atkins found the uncle's Yamaha learner's guitar in an attic and used it to teach herself how to play.

==== Video ====
The video, directed by David Simon, features fantastic scenes and dreamlike sequences set in a faded amusement area, with moving images of Atkins transposed on older still photographs. The intentional grainy and distorted look of the video evokes the old peep shows one would have found in early 20th century seaside resorts like Brighton or Atlantic City.

It opens in a meadow of tall grass (with a barely visible Atkins to the left) and pans right, past an old roadside billboard. An image of the Roman god Neptune is briefly visible on the billboard before fading to black. The camera then moves in on the image of an old amusement park separated from the meadow by a body of water.

From there, the camera zooms in on Atkins in color, transposed on a black-and-white image of the old Atlantic City Boardwalk. As she sings “I’ll be leaving this place soon,” the picture changes to an image of rapidly deteriorating film but with a statue of Neptune clearly visible in the center of the frame, a reference to the namesake location.

Later scenes show Atkins lying down across an image of Tillie and walking down a set of stairs onto the beach. As the video progresses, the images play in reverse, with the final scene returning to the meadow with the billboard and finally Atkins by the roadside before fading to black. Throughout the video, Atkins is the only person seen both in color and moving. The still photos may represent snapshots of a distant time the singer cannot bring back. They could also represent the world of the living, from which the singer is forever separated.

== Personnel ==
- Sven Andersson – flute, saxophone
- Seth Avett – liner notes
- David Carlsson – engineer
- Daniel "Shaolun" Chen – electric piano, mellotron, vibraphone, reed organ
- Emil de Waal – vocals
- Mattias Gustavsson – vocals
- Dave Hollinghurst – guitar
- Tore Johansson – acoustic guitar, bass, producer, slide guitar, acoustic bass guitar, mixing
- Maria Køhnke – vocals
- Jens Lindgard – bass, guitar, trombone
- Peter Lindgard – percussion, trumpet, drums
- Vlado Meller – mastering
- Daniel Mintzer – drums
- Filip Runesson – violin, viola
- Jenny Johnson - cello
- Andrew Scheps – mixing
- Chris Spooner – art direction
- Andreas Stellan – vocals
- Ulf Turesson – vocals
- Jennifer Tzar – photography
