= The Dirty Clergy =

American pop rock band

- Origin: Winfield, Alabama, United States
- Genres: Garage rock
- Instruments: Fender Jazzmaster, Rickenbacker 330
- Years active: 2010–present
- Label: Cornelius Chapel Records
- Members: Brian Manasco; Ky Carter; Cody Moorehead
- Website: http://www.thedirtyclergy.com

The Dirty Clergy is a garage rock/pop band from Winfield, Alabama, whose music has been described as vintage rock, indie rock, and "indie rock pop'n'roll". Their music recalls '50s and early '60s rock 'n' roll, while also possessing hard edge. The band has been featured on numerous radio programs including Nights with Alice Cooper and Rodney on the Roq at KROQ Los Angeles. Most recently the band was featured in season 10 episodes of the Showtime series Shameless.

== Truth Wars, Shake EP, Revival ==
Formed in 2009 in Winfield, Alabama the musical project consists of Brian Manasco, Ky Carter, and Joshua Pope. The band started as a two-piece folk band with Manasco and Tyler Evans. It wasn't until July 2010 when the full band formed, with its current style.

The band's "Breakdown" EP was recorded in San Antonio, Texas by Gordon Raphael, well known for his work with The Strokes and Regina Spektor. However, the EP was never officially released. The EP was followed in 2011 by their first full-length album, "Revival."

2012 saw the band tour the U.S., garnering positive reviews of their live shows and album. The Dayton City Paper proclaimed the band as a 'new gear in the rock and roll transmission'.

== Shake, Shake ==
After a brief time off in 2013, the band returned in 2014 to record "Shake, Shake", a single. It appeared on mtvU and axs-TV. Its success landed them the title of 2014's Rock Artist of the Year from fashion blog Glitter & Stilletos. It also led to their national television premiere's on both MTV and AXS TV.

== Rattlesnake ==
The band's second studio album was recorded in Birmingham, Alabama between January and August 2015. The band has received moderate success with it including a top 10 showing on the KKBB Alt specialty charts album category and a top 5 with the single 'Summer Days'.

Paul Cashmere, Australian music journalist, picked up on the release 'Rattlesnake' saying, "This is a band and an album I’m quite excited about. The Dirty Clergy represent everything that made Rock great." Canadian music blog The Revue said The Dirty Clergy are a reminder that a classic genre can still feel refreshing and inviting. Alabama journalist John Archibald did a piece on the band saying "Hard work reminiscent of Springsteen, familiar and groovy and comfortable, but driving like a bunch of Alabama rockers chasing a dream through the streets of Manhattan." During the Summer of 2016 the tunes caught the attention of notable dj's Rodney Bingenheimer of KROQ Los Angeles and Scott Register of Reg's Coffeehouse.

The band stated in an interview with Round Magazine that 'Summer Days' was one of the final songs written for the album 'Rattlesnake'. The original intention for the song was to have a set of these 'beachy/summer' type songs and do a 5 or 6 song EP.

On September 9, 2016, Canadian radio broadcaster Alan Cross included the band's single 'Summer Days' in his Top 11 Songs of the Week.

The Dirty Clergy was featured, alongside English singer/songwriter David Gray, in an October 2016 edition of XS Noize Music's podcast being the featured band with their song 'Gold' The site also included them in their 'Unsigned Showcase' feature.

In an interview with ReverbNation, the band confirmed they will be in the studio again with 'Rattlesnake' producer Lester Nuby III.

On July 12, 2017, The Dirty Clergy premiered their music video for 'I' on AXS; followed by their SiriusXM debut with 'Summer Days' on Little Steven's Underground Garage with that video premiering on the prominent UK music blog One Stop Record Shop.

The Dirty Clergy appeared on the Alabama Media Group list of "25 Essential Alabama bands to know for 2018".

== In Waves ==
In Waves was recorded at Ol Elegante Studio in Homewood, AL from December 2017 until March 2019. The first single, 'Trials', was premiered by Left Bank Mag in July, 2019. The song was also featured on the Spotify 'Fresh Finds' playlist. The video for 'Trials' was premiered by the long running music magazine, The Big Takeover.

An early review, from The Chattanooga Pulse, of the complete album praised the band by saying the "emotional impact is unexpected and stunning. Deconstructing the tunes on In Waves, it is clear that there is genius at work."

After the release of Trials the band was signed to Birmingham independent record label Cornelius Chapel Records. In March 2020 'Lucy' premiered on Glide Magazine "The video featured a downtrodden woman suffering from depression, the song brings to mind the ethereal folk rock of acts like the Fleet Foxes and Bon Iver."

In April they released 'Homesick' via national music magazine American Songwriter. “‘Homesick’ was written after the Parkland school shooting at Stoneman Douglas High School,” Dirty Clergy’s singer, songwriter, and guitarist Brian Manasco tells American Songwriter of the track. “I believe we, as a country, are better than this. It is a shame that students can't get an education without the thought of this happening. It is also a shame that this has almost been normalized–they practice drills for this kind of thing. Nothing should be off the table to prevent these acts from occurring.”

Their song 'Born To Lose' got introduced through MXDWN, a Los Angeles, California entertainment site. It was a return to their garage rock sound, albeit a slow and steady fashion.

The album has garnered some impressive and rave reviews getting a 5/5 star from Albumism. "Part of what makes this album so much fun is the way The Dirty Clergy are able to replicate the denseness of shoegaze and synth pop with conventional rock & roll instrumentation. Calling it a garage sound implies a certain kind of rawness and calling it lo-fi makes it sound like they're noisy. In reality, In Waves is polished and clean, but with a healthy dollop of alt-rock reverb and rock & roll chaos. The sound is ambitious and open, folding in the best of quite a few of my favorite genres, but perhaps In Waves biggest strength is the yin and the yang chasing each other in every song." It also received a 'B+' review from The Vinyl District. "As the record breaks 53 minutes, there are numerous high points, including opener “Trials,” the catchy and synth-tinged “Homesick,” the chunkier “West Coast,” and the rhythmically hard-hitting vocal duet “Parades.” A worthy set, executed well".

The album was listed at #35 on Albumism's 100 Best Albums of 2020.

== Television and film appearances ==
- Shameless (American TV series) - The Dirty Clergy - "Decades", "Strange Love"

== Band Members ==
=== Current members ===
- Brian Manasco - Vocals, Guitar (2010–present)
- Ky Carter - Bass (2012–present)

=== Touring Members ===
- Joshua Pope - Guitar (2010–present)
- Cody Moorehead - Drums (2012–present)

== IMA Nomination ==
The Dirty Clergy's 'Rattlesnake' was nominated by Music Resource Group (MRG) for best indie/alt rock album in The 15th annual Independent Music Awards. The event is held each November at Lincoln Center in New York, NY.

== Awards and nominations ==
Year	Award	Category	Nominated Work	Result
2016	Independent Music Awards	Rock Album of the Year	Rattlesnake	Nominated

== Discography ==
=== Albums ===
- Truth Wars Demo (2010)
- Revival (2011)
- Rattlesnake (2016)
- In Waves (2020)

=== EPs ===
- The Breakdown (2011)
- Shake (2012)
- Live at The Stork Club - Oakland, CA (2012)
- Revived (2026)

=== Singles ===
- "Shake, Shake" (2014)
- "All I Need" (2016)
- "Summer Days" ft. Karina Noelle (2016)
- "Decades" (2016)
- "Gold" (2016)
- "Nothing" (2017)
- "Do or Die" (2017)
- "I" (2017)
- "Trials" (2019)
- "Lucy" (2020)
- "Homesick" (2020)
- "Born to Lose" (2020)
- "Whiplash" (2020)
- "A Kid on Christmas" (2025)
- "Because" (2026)

=== KKBB Alt Rock Charting ===
Album	Peak position
Rattlesnake	#8 #26 (WUSC)
Singles	
Summer Days ft. Karina Noelle	#4
Strange Love	#3
Gold	#8
All I Need	#5
Ghost Stories	#10

== See also ==
- Music of United States
- American rock
- Category:American musical groups
- Music of Alabama
- List of indie pop artists
