= Nicole Atkins =

American singer-songwriter (born 1978)

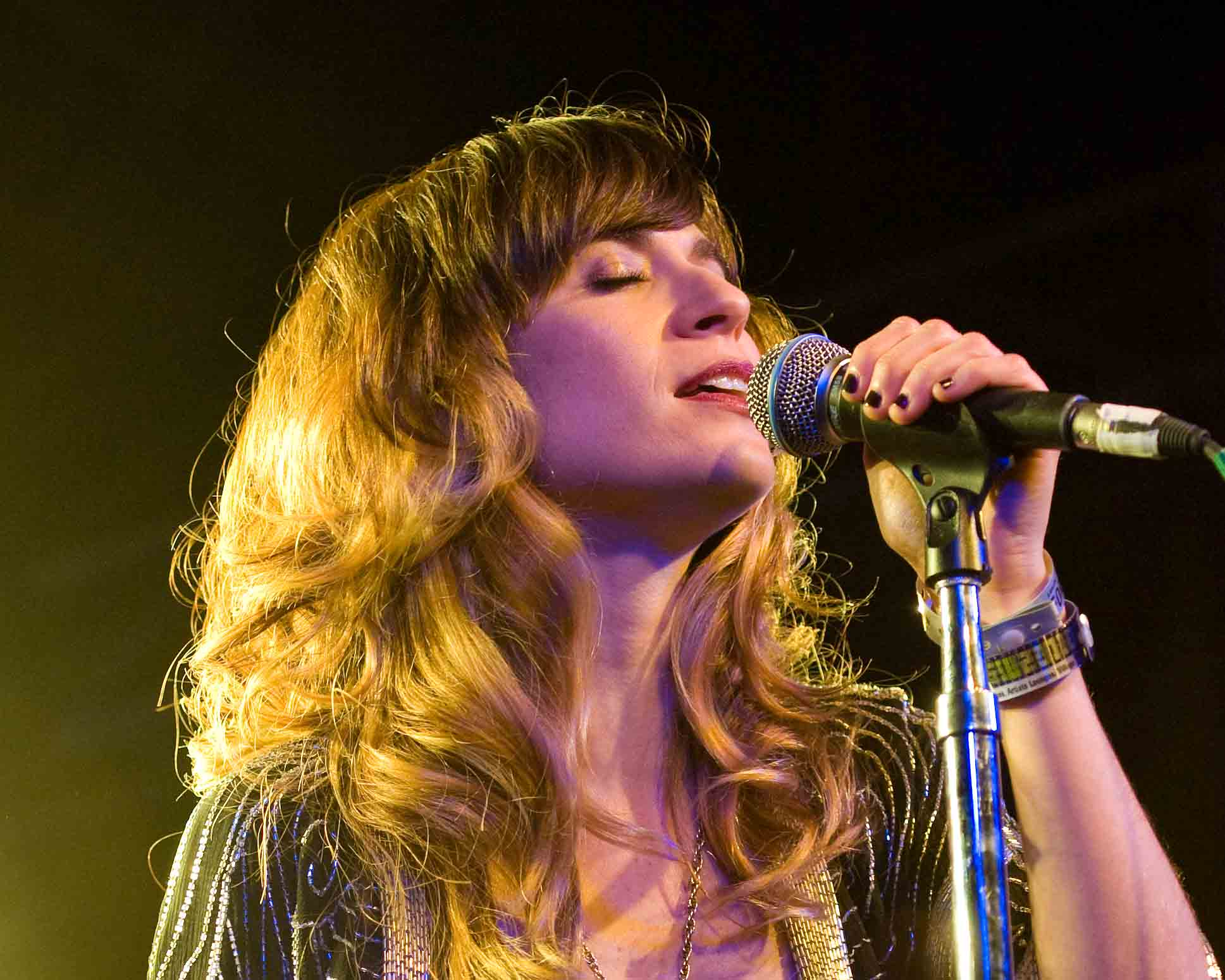
- Nicole Atkins performing at La Zona Rosa during SXSW in Austin, Texas on March 18, 2010

Background information
- Born: October 1, 1978 (age 48); Neptune, New Jersey, United States
- Genres: Soul, psychedelic, Americana
- Instruments: Vocals, guitar
- Years active: 2002–present
- Labels: Single Lock Records, Oh' Mercy/Thirty Tigers, Razor & Tie Records, Columbia, Red Ink
- Website: nicoleatkins.com

Nicole Atkins (born October 1, 1978) is an American singer-songwriter. Her influences include 1950s crooner music, 1960s psychedelia, soul music, and the Brill Building style of writing. Atkins has been compared to Roy Orbison and singers from the Brill Building era.

== Early life ==
Atkins was born in Neptune, New Jersey. She grew up in Shark River Hills, a middle class enclave within Neptune overlooking the Shark River. Atkins has cited the bay as a major inspiration for her music, particularly the imagery of "the river in the rain" found in the title track on her album Neptune City. She started playing piano at nine years old and taught herself to play guitar at 13. She eschewed more popular acts of the day for musical groups her parents listened to, such as The Ronettes, Johnny Cash, and The Beach Boys. She has cited the vocalists Harriet Wheeler of The Sundays and Cass Elliot as important early influences.

She started playing in pick-up bands and doing gigs at local coffeehouses while attending St. Rose High School in the nearby town of Belmar.

== Career ==
=== Early beginnings in North Carolina and New York ===
After high school, Atkins moved to Charlotte, North Carolina to study illustration at the University of North Carolina at Charlotte. She ingrained herself within the city's independent music scene, discovering bands like Superchunk and Uncle Tupelo. She also started writing original songs and befriending other local musicians. Among other bands, she joined a supergroup in the city called Nitehawk that, at one point, had almost 30 members. After she returned, she joined the band Los Parasols, releasing an EP with them entitled The Summer of Love in 2002. That same year, Atkins moved to the neighborhood of Bensonhurst in Brooklyn, New York. Influenced by the artists signed to independent label Rainbow Quartz, she strayed from the louder rock music she'd played in North Carolina and moved toward the songcraft style of Wilco and Roy Orbison. She returned to Charlotte and played with several bands, most notably a group called Virginia Reel. At this time, she started writing what she termed "a mix of Americana, 60s, and indie rock." She also recorded her EP Bleeding Diamonds.

Early 2003, she commuted into Manhattan by train to play gigs and maintain a connection to the city's underground music scene. In mid-2004, Atkins and David Muller, who had played drums with Fischerspooner and The Fiery Furnaces, started working on a demo CD entitled Party's Over. They recorded most of the album in Atkins' parents' house using a Casio keyboard, a ProTools rig, and a mini recorder. Drum parts were recorded at Muller's apartment in Manhattan, with further tracks recorded at the Dietch Projects gallery in Brooklyn.

=== 2005–2009: The Sea and Neptune City ===
In early 2005, keyboardist Dan Chen, whom Atkins knew from her days at The Sidewalk Café, approached Atkins about forming a new group. The band, now known as Nicole Atkins & The Sea, was given a residency at the small showcase bar, Piano's, and won the attention of music industry attorney Gillian Bar. She soon found herself in the midst of a bidding war between record labels and signed with Columbia Records in January 2006. In late 2006, Atkins and the Sea traveled to Sweden to record her debut album, Neptune City, at Varispeed Studios in Kalgerup and Gula Studion in Malmö with producer Tore Johansson. The album was originally scheduled for a July 2007 release, but at the behest of Columbia co-chairman Rick Rubin, it was pushed back until October 30, 2007, to accommodate re-mastering the album. It debuted at number 20 on Billboard's Top Heatseekers chart and reached number 6 on the Heatseekers Middle Atlantic Chart. In 2008, Atkins' backing vocals were prominently featured on A.C. Newman's second solo album, Get Guilty, released in 2009.

=== 2010–2011: The Black Sea and Mondo Amore ===
In January 2010, Atkins and The Black Sea started recording new material at Brooklyn's Seaside Lounge studio with producer Phil Palazzolo, with whom Atkins had previously worked during sessions for Get Guilty in 2008. Several other musicians joined Atkins in the studio to record the tracks for what would become her second album, Mondo Amore, including guitarist Irina Yalkowsky, drummer Mike Graham, and bassist Jeremy Kay. Graham, Oklan, Yalkowsky and Kay would form the core lineup of The Black Sea with whom Atkins would tour in support of Mondo Amore. In June 2010, Atkins signed with New York-based independent label Razor & Tie. The label released Mondo Amore on February 8, 2011. The album received coverage from The New York Times, and Rolling Stone. The release party was held at The Music Hall of Williamsburg and announced in The New Yorker. In the month following the release Nicole Atkins and the Black Sea performed at South By Southwest and were reviewed by Spin Magazine as "the best live band of the festival.".

=== 2012–2014: Slow Phaser ===
In the winter of 2012, Nicole returned to Malmö, Sweden to record with Tore Johansson on her latest record, Slow Phaser. The album was released February 4, 2014, to rave reviews and a peak position of 143 on the Billboard 200. The album's first single, "Girl You Look Amazing" was premiered by Paste and the video for the album's second single, "Who Killed the Moonlight?", was premiered by NPR's First Watch. In February 2014, Nicole returned to Late Night with David Letterman to perform on his last season, a new rendition of her song "War Torn," off of her "Live from the Masonic Temple, Detroit" album, which was recorded while on tour as the opening act for Nick Cave and the Bad Seeds.

=== 2017–present: Goodnight Rhonda Lee and Italian Ice ===
Goodnight Rhonda Lee is Nicole Atkins' fourth studio album, which was recorded at Single Lock Records in Florence, Alabama and was released on July 21, 2017. Goodnight Rhonda Lee was produced and engineered by Niles City Sound: production, engineering, drums, and percussion on all tracks by Josh Block; production, guitar on all tracks, and musical arrangements by Austin Jenkins; production and engineering by Chris Vivion. The first single off her record was "Goodnight Rhonda Lee" which is about her past behavior and finally putting it to rest. Her next single following "Goodnight Rhonda Lee" is "Listen Up." In "Listen Up" Atkins is very self-critical on how her life lessons were learned the hard way. Goodnight Rhonda Lee received an 83/100 score and 4 out of 5 stars.

Atkins released her fifth studio album, Italian Ice, in 2020. It was recorded at Muscle Shoals Sound Studio in Alabama, and featured several musicians associated with that studio. A review in American Songwriter concluded, "Why Atkins didn’t achieve star status with Goodbye Rhonda Lee isn’t clear. This flawlessly conceived follow-up draws from many of the same influences yet broadens her boundaries. It’s every bit as potent and expertly arranged, putting it in play as an early contender for one of 2020s finest albums." In 2021, she released Memphis Ice, an acoustic version of Italian Ice recorded in Memphis.

=== Other work ===
In 2008, Atkins was cast as the voice of the mother in director Geoff Marslett's animated sci-fi comedy film Mars. On September 9 of that year, she released a four-track EP of cover songs called Nicole Atkins Digs Other People's Songs, which included the tracks: "The Crystal Ship" (The Doors), "Dream a Little Dream of Me" (The Mamas & the Papas), "Under the Milky Way" (The Church) and "Inside of Love" (Nada Surf). In 2009, Atkins' backing vocals were featured prominently on AC Newman's second solo album, Get Guilty.

Atkins provide vocals for the track "Solano Avenue" (as Estrella Cumpas) on David Byrne and Fatboy Slim's 2010 album, Here Lies Love.

Atkins also joined the 9th annual Independent Music Awards judging panel to assist independent musicians' careers.

Atkins recorded a cover of Bruce Springsteen's "Dancing in the Dark" in 2014 for a compilation album titled Dead Man's Town, a tribute to Springsteen's Born in the U.S.A. LP.

In 2016 Cotton Mather released a three-song EP on Star Apple Kingdom titled Cotton Mather with Nicole Atkins, featuring the songs "Girl Friday," "Faded," and "Call Me The Witch."

Nicole Atkins produced and co-wrote "Too Late" and "Saturday" for Tommy Stinson's Bash & Pop which were released by Fat Possum Records.

Nicole Atkins co-wrote "Those Were The Days" with Old 97's from their album Graveyard Whistling which was released by ATO Records.

Nicole Atkins covered "Joey" by Concrete Blonde, which was released December 8, 2017, as part of the Shovels & Ropes duet album, Busted Jukebox: Volume 2.

== Personal life ==
When not on the road, she lives in Nashville, TN.

== Discography ==
=== EPs ===
- 2006: Bleeding Diamonds, EP (Columbia)
- 2007: Austin City Limits Music Festival 2007: Nicole Atkins & The Sea, EP (Sony BMG Music Entertainment)
- 2008: Nicole Atkins Digs Other People's Songs, EP (Columbia)
- 2011: ...Till Dawn, EP (Razor & Tie)
- 2014: A Nightmare Before Summer, EP

=== Albums ===
- 2007: Neptune City (Columbia)
- 2011: Mondo Amore (Razor & Tie)
- 2014: Slow Phaser (Oh'Mercy!)
- 2017: Goodnight Rhonda Lee (Single Lock)
- 2020: Italian Ice (Single Lock)
- 2021: Memphis Ice (Single Lock)
- 2026: Drama (Wicked Game/Sun Records)

=== with Los Parasols ===
- 2002: The Summer of Love (EP)

=== with Hungry Ghost ===
- 2004: "Hungry Ghost"

(Atkins sang backup vocals on "Police State Xmas")

=== Compilation albums ===
- 2008: Music From The Motion Picture Choke ATO Records

(Atkins contributed a cover of The Doors' "The Crystal Ship")

- 2008: The Hotel Café Presents Winter Songs Epic

(Atkins contributed a cover of the Billy Hayes and Jay Johnson penned "Blue Christmas")

- 2009: Scott Walker – 30 Century Man

(Atkins contributed a cover of Scott Walker's "The Seventh Seal")

- 2010: Dear New Orleans

(Atkins contributed a cover of Led Zeppelin's "When the Levee Breaks")

- 2012: Tim Adams and Mike Viola's HAREM: Songs from the Movie "That's What She Said"

(Atkins contributed the track "All Wrong")

- 2013: College Radio Day: The Album, Vol. 2

(Atkins contributed the track "The Stranger")

- 2014: Dead Man's Town: A Tribute to Born In the U.S.A. Lightning Rod Records

(Atkins contributed a cover of Bruce Springsteen's "Dancing In the Dark")

=== Singles ===
Title	Year	Peak chart positions	Album
Title	Year	US AAA	Album
"Darkness Falls So Quiet"	2017	–	Goodnight Rhonda Lee
"Domino"	2020	29	Italian Ice

== Awards and nominations ==
2002

- Asbury Music Awards Winner: Top Female Vocalist
- Asbury Music Awards Winner: Best Solo Act
- Asbury Music Awards Winner: Song of the Year – "Neptune City"

2005

- ASCAP Foundation winner: Sammy Cahn Award – "Neptune City"
