= Lighten Up =

Studio album by Erin Rae
- Released: February 4, 2022
- Genre: Indie Folk
- Length: 41:46
- Label: Thirty Tigers
- Producer: Jonathan Wilson

Erin Rae chronology
Putting On Airs (2018)	Lighten Up (2022)

Singles from Lighten Up
- 1. "True Love's Face" Released: 2021; 2. "Modern Woman" Released: 2021; 3. "Candy & Curry" Released: 2021; 4. "Cosmic Sigh" Released: 2022

Professional ratings
Review scores
Source	Rating
PopMatters	8/10
Under the Radar (magazine)	8/10
Mojo (magazine)	4/5 stars
Uncut (magazine)	8/10
God Is In The TV	8/10
Pitchfork	7.3/10

Lighten Up is the second solo studio album by American singer-songwriter Erin Rae, released in 2022. It peaked at number 47 on the UK Albums Chart.

== Album information ==
The album gained critical attention upon release and was ranked at 85 in Rolling Stone's Best Albums Of 2022 list. The positive reception surrounding the album prompted Rae to embark on her first headlining tour across the United States in the fall of 2023. The tour produced a subsequent live album, titled Lighten Up & Try (Live From The Heart) which features performances of all the songs on Lighten Up in addition to songs from elsewhere in Rae's discography.

== Track listing ==
All tracks are written by Erin Rae, except where noted

No.	Title	Writer(s)	Length
1.	"Candy & Curry"		3:34
2.	"Can't See Stars (feat. Kevin Morby)"		3:37
3.	"True Love's Face"		3:21
4.	"Gonna Be Strange"		3:20
5.	"California Belongs To You"		3:38
6.	"Cosmic Sigh"		3:41
7.	"Modern Woman"		3:25
8.	"Drift Away"		3:41
9.	"Enemy"		3:43
10.	"Mind/Heart"		3:52
11.	"Lighten Up & Try"	Rae, Andrew Combs	3:07
12.	"Undone"		2:47

== Personnel ==
- Erin Rae – guitar, vocals
- Jonathan Wilson – drums, percussion, guitar, banjo, wurlitzer, mellotron, harmonium, tambourine, harpsichord, backing vocals
- Drew Erickson - piano, solina, harpsichord, clavinet, organ, wurlitzer, string arrangements
- Jake Blanton - bass, strings, backing vocals
- Spencer Cullum - pedal steel
- Kevin Morby - additional vocals, strings
- Meg Duffy - electric guitar
- Grant Milliken - vibraphone
- Gus Seyffert - bowed bass
- Andrew Bulbrook - violin
- Wyton Grant - violin
- Zach Dellinger - viola
- Jacob Braun - Cello

=== Production ===
- Producer: Jonathan Wilson
- Engineers: Grant Milliken, Michael Harris (6)
- Assistant Engineer: Franky Newby (6)
- Mixing: Jonathan Wilson
- Mastering: John Baldwin
- Conducting: Drew Erickson (6)

== Charts ==
Chart (2022)	Peak position
UK Albums Chart	47
