= The Pine Hill Haints =

US musical group

- The Pine Hill Haints performing at Fred's in Loachapoka, Alabama. (Pictured from left: Kat Barrier, Ben Rhyne, Jamie Barrier, Matt Bakula)

Background information
- Origin: Auburn, Alabama
- Genres: Folk
- Years active: 1998–present
- Labels: Arkam Records, Lelp, Sunburst, K
- Members: Jamie Barrier; Katie "Kat" Barrier; Stevie LaBlanc; Brian "Zero" Borden; Justin Ward
- Past members: Travis Hightower; Matt Bakula; Ben Rhyne; Sarah Nelson; Roger Holcombe; Rymodee; Bradley Williams; Jeremy Dale Henderson; Matt Comer
- Website: http://www.thepinehillhaints.com/

The Pine Hill Haints are an American traditional bluegrass/folk/honky tonk/country band from Alabama, though the band members themselves describe their unique southern roots music as "Alabama Ghost Music."

The Haints are composed of Jamie Barrier on guitar and vocals, Katie "Kat" Barrier on mandolin, singing saw, and washboard, Stevie LaBlanc on washtub bass, Justin Ward on accordion and trombone, and Brian "Zero" Borden on snare drum.

== Current line-up ==
- Jamie Barrier – vocals, guitar, fiddle, harmonica
- Katie "Kat" Barrier – washboard, mandolin, saw
- Matt Bakula – vocals, washtub, tenor banjo
- Stevie LaBlanc – washtub, banjo, harmonica
- Brian "Zero" Borden – snare
- Justin Ward – accordion, trombone

=== Former members ===
- Travis Hightower – washtub
- Matt Bakula – washtub, tenor banjo
- Ben Rhyne – snare
- Joey Barrier – banjo
- Sarah Nelson – accordion
- Roger Holcombe – snare
- Rymodee – saw
- Bradley Williams – washtub
- Jeremy Dale Henderson – snare
- Matt Comer – snare
- Mike Posey – accordion
- Jon Lucius – accordion
- J.R. Collins – snare

== Musical style ==
The Pine Hill Haints perform music they consider to be "dead" in the modern world, hence their self-proclaimed "Ghost Music." Some examples of the genres they perform include (but are not limited to) gospel, rockabilly, rock and roll, celtic music, blues music, and bluegrass. While their catalog of songs comprises mainly original material, the band has also been known to cover traditional gospel (Where The Soul Of Man Never Dies, Where The Roses Never Fade), cowboy (I Ride An Old Paint, Back In The Saddle Again), and folk (Goodnight Irene, Oh! Suzanna/Camptown Races) songs.

In addition to their live instruments, the band also utilizes a number of traditional American folk music instruments (such as a fiddle, harmonica, tenor banjo, mandolin, saw, and accordion) on their recordings. Occasionally, members of the Haints will swap instruments or abandon his or her primary instrument altogether, instead performing on one of the aforementioned instruments for a song or two. The band has several former members, and depending on how many happen to be present at a performance, surprise guest performers may accompany the Haints onstage. Such impromptu reunion performances are not completely unexpected at their shows.

== Discography ==
Year	Title	Label	Format	Other information
2000	God, the Devil and the Two by the Gate	Arkam Records	12-inch LP	
2002	The Cold, Cold Hand	Arkam Records	CD	Split album with The Natchez Shakers ("The Devil's Backbone").
2002	Tales From The Front Porch	Arkam Records	12-inch LP	Split album with The Crypt Kickers and The Plain Clothes Creep String Trio.
2002	Alabama Ghost Country Music	Nation of Kids	7-inch EP	
2003	Trains Have No Names	Arkam Records	CD	
2003	Split	Arkam Records	7-inch EP	Split with David Dondero, 500 copies pressed on black vinyl.
2004	Those Who Wander	Arkam Records	CD	
2004	You Bury Your Hate In A Shallow Grave	Lelp Recordings	CD	
2005	The Pine Hill Haints Meet Clampitt, Gaddis & Buck	Lelp Recordings	CD	Split album with Clampitt Gaddis & Buck.
2005	Jack of Diamonds	Arkam Records	7-inch EP	500 copies pressed on black vinyl.
2007	Darktime Came to the Hills	Sunburst Records	7-inch EP	500 copies pressed on black vinyl with hand-screened covers
2007	Ghost Dance	K Records	12-inch LP / CD	
2009	To Win or To Lose	K Records	12-inch LP / CD	
2009	Riding the Long Southern Train Blues	Arkam Records	7-inch EP	Included with Spidder #14 zine.
2010	Black Casket	Razorcake / 45RPM Records	7-inch EP	110 copies pressed on translucent red vinyl, the rest on black vinyl.
2010	Split	Let's Pretend Records	7-inch EP	Split EP with the Trainwreck Riders. 110 copies pressed on clear vinyl, 440 copies pressed on black vinyl.
2011	The Evening Star	Arkam Records / 45RPM Records/Burger Records	12-inch LP / CD / Cassette	Compilation album featuring songs from various Haints 7-inch EPs and previously unreleased tracks. LP and CD released on Arkam Records, cassette jointly released by 45RPM Records and Burger Records. Cassette edition limited to 250 hand-numbered copies.
2011	Welcome to the Midnight Opry	K Records	12-inch LP / CD	
2011	Split	Ya Dig? Records	10-inch EP / CD-R	Split EP with Serious Sam Barrett. Packaged together with CD-R of the Split.
2011	Tales of Crime	K Records	7-inch EP	Release #138 in K Records' International Pop Underground 7-inch series
2014	Rabbit in the Pea Patch	Arkam Records	7-inch EP	Hand-screened cover art available in three colors: red, green, and blue.
2014	Moon Pie	Arkam Records	CD	Contains songs from the Rabbit in the Pea Patch 7-inch, and the Fadeaways split 7-inch.
2014	Split	Snuffy Smiles / Arkam Records	7-inch EP	Split EP with The Fadeaways
2014	The Magik Sounds of the Pine Hill Haints	K Records	12-inch LP / CD / Cassette	
2016	The Cold, Cold Hand/The Devil's Backbone	Arkam Records		
2017	Smoke	Arkam Records	12-inch LP / CD	
2020	13	Arkam Records	12-inch LP	
2021	The Song Companion of a Lonestar Cowboy	Single Lock Records	12-inch LP / CD	
2025	Shattered Pieces of The True Cross	Single Lock Records	12-inch LP / CD	

== See also ==
This Bike Is A Pipe Bomb, J.D. Wilkes
