= Ghost Dance (The Pine Hill Haints album) =

Studio album by The Pine Hill Haints
- Released: 2007
- Recorded: 2006–2007
- Genre: Bluegrass, Alabama ghost music, folk, honky tonk, country
- Length: 45:02
- Label: K Records
- Producer: Jamie Barrier, Katie Barrier, Lynn Bridges, Calvin Johnson, Danny Spurr

The Pine Hill Haints chronology
Those Who Wander (2004)	Ghost Dance (2007)	To Win or To Lose (2009)

Professional ratings
Review scores
Source	Rating
Pitchfork Media	link

Ghost Dance is the third studio album by The Pine Hill Haints. It was released in 2007 on K Records.

== Track listing ==
=== Side A ===
1. "Spirit of 1812" (Jamie) – 2:14
2. "For Every Glass That's Empty" (Jamie) – 1:55
3. "I Never Thought the Day Would Come When You Could Hate Me So" (Jamie) – 2:07
4. "Say Something, Say Anything" (Jamie) – 1:34
5. "St. Louis Blues" (Traditional) – 3:12
6. "Phantom Rules" (Jamie) – 2:10
7. "When You Fall" (Jamie) – 2:04
8. "Death By Stereo" (Matt) – 1:28
9. "Garden of the Dead" (J.D. Crypt Kickers) – 2:10
10. "Whisper in the Dark" (Jamie) – 2:01

=== Side B ===
1. "You're Gonna Need Somebody on You're Bond" (Traditional) – 2:57
2. "Catfish Angels" (Jamie) – 2:45
3. "St. James Infirmary Blues" (Traditional) – 2:05
4. "Cuckoo Bird" (Traditional) – 2:18
5. "Columbus Stockade Blues" (Traditional) – 2:09
6. "Walkin' Talkin' Deadman" (Matt) – 2:31
7. "Ol' White Thang Blues" (Jamie) – 3:52
8. "Raggle Taggle Gypsy" (Traditional) – 1:53
9. "Leo O'Sullivan Blues" (from Cork Co. Ireland) – 0:55
10. "Wake Up" (Jamie) – 2:32

== Personnel ==
The Pine Hill Haints are

- Jamie Barrier – Guitar, Fiddle, Tenor banjo
- Katie Barrier – Washboard. Mandolin, Saw
- Matt Bakula – Washtub bass, Banjo
- Ben Rhyne – Snare drum, Snake rattle

And

- Mike Posey – accordion
- Bradley Willams – Washtub bass

Along With

- Jeremy Dale Henderson – Snare drum
- Willie Jones – Bodhran
- Natalia Beylis – Mandolin
- Perrine Pericart – Flute
- Dee Kirwin – Vocals
- Danny Spurr – Banjo
