= Sea of Noise =

Studio album by St. Paul and The Broken Bones
- Released: September 9, 2016
- Length: 47:51
- Label: Records
- Producer: Paul Butler

St. Paul and The Broken Bones chronology
Half the City (2014)	Sea of Noise (2016)	Young Sick Camellia (2018)

Sea of Noise is the second studio album by American band St. Paul and The Broken Bones. It was released on September 9, 2016, by Records. The lead single "All I Ever Wonder" was released on June 16, 2016. The album was produced by Paul Butler.

== Background ==
On May 23, 2016, Rolling Stone reported that St. Paul and The Broken Bones were to release Sea of Noise on September 9, 2016. A trailer for the album, which shows the band recording album track "Crumbling Light Posts Pt. 1" with the Tennessee Mass Choir, was released in conjunction. Sea of Noise is the first album by the band since the departure of trombonist Ben Griner in May 2015.

== Singles ==
The album was preceded by the release of the lead single "All I Ever Wonder" on June 16, 2016. The song was inspired by vocalist Paul Janeway's apathy towards multiple issues, and the song addresses topics such as gentrification and politics.

== Critical reception ==
Professional ratings
Aggregate scores
Source	Rating
Metacritic	80/100
Review scores
Source	Rating
AllMusic	4/5 stars
American Songwriter	4/5 stars
Paste	7.5/10
Rolling Stone	3.5/5 stars
Uncut	4/5 stars

Upon release, Sea of Noise received positive acclaim from music critics. At Metacritic, which assigns a normalized rating out of 100 based on reviews from critics, the album has an average score of 80 based on 5 critic reviews, indicating "generally favorable reviews".

Ann Powers of NPR wrote that the album "lifts [St. Paul and The Broken Bones] from its spot as the nation's best young party band into headier and more exciting territory," and highlighted how the album is relevant in current times by noting that several of the album's tracks address topics such as racial injustice and political unrest.

== Track listing ==
Sea of Noise track listing
No.	Title	Length
1.	"Crumbling Light Posts, Pt. 1"	1:30
2.	"Flow with It (You Got Me Feeling Like)"	3:16
3.	"Midnight on the Earth"	3:53
4.	"I'll Be Your Woman"	3:56
5.	"All I Ever Wonder"	3:29
6.	"Sanctify"	5:55
7.	"Crumbling Light Posts, Pt. 2"	0:37
8.	"Waves"	3:33
9.	"Brain Matter"	3:57
10.	"Burning Rome"	4:04
11.	"Tears in the Diamond"	3:46
12.	"Is It Me"	2:13
13.	"Crumbling Light Posts, Pt. 3"	0:55
14.	"La Bruit"	3:04
15.	"All I Ever Wonder" (Mahogany Session)	3:36

== Personnel ==
Credits for Sea of Noise adapted from Tidal and AllMusic

=== Musicians ===
- St. Paul and The Broken Bones – composers, lyricists
- Jason Clark and the Tennessee Choir – additional vocals (1, 7, 13)
- Yennifer Correia – violin
- Jonathan Kirkscey – cello
- Jessie Munson – violin
- Jennifer Puckett – viola

=== Technical ===
- Paul Butler – production, mixing
- Jeff Powell – engineering
- Mike Stankiewicz – assistant engineering
- Wesley Graham – assistant engineering
- Greg Calbi – mastering engineering
- Steve Fallone – mastering engineering
- Lester Snell – string arrangements

=== Design ===
- Aaron Gresham – art direction

== Charts ==
Chart performance for Sea of Noise
Chart (2016)	Peak position
US Billboard 200	44
