= Mondo Amore =

Studio album by Nicole Atkins
- Released: February 8, 2011
- Genre: Indie rock
- Label: Razor & Tie

Nicole Atkins chronology
| Neptune City (2007) | Mondo Amore (2011) | Slow Phaser (2014) |

Mondo Amore is the second album by Nicole Atkins. It was released in the United States on February 8, 2011 by Razor & Tie Music.

== Background ==
Mondo Amore has its genesis in a time of extreme turbulence for Atkins, a period which saw her parting ways with her former major label, Columbia Records, while also dealing with the painful termination of a long-term personal relationship. Additionally, her former backing band, The Sea, abandoned the project a week into the January 2010 start of recording the new album. Atkins dealt with these changes by returning to her adopted home of Brooklyn and eventually set to work at The Seaside Lounge Recording Studio in Park Slope. There she met producer Phil Palazzolo and agreed to work together for her next project. Atkins also collaborated with Robert Harrison of Austin, Texas’ psych-pop bands Cotton Mather and Future Clouds and Radar for the songs "Cry, Cry, Cry" and "Hotel Plaster". Atkins' goal was to create a more volatile sound than she had ever previously attempted, a sonic approach akin to such influences as Scott Walker and Nick Cave, while also touching on longtime inspirations like the blues and classic 60s psychedelic rock. The collective of musicians who assisted Atkins on Mondo Amore morphed into her new backing combo, The Black Sea, comprising guitarist Irina Yalkowsky, bassist Jeremy Kay and drummer Ezra Oklan. She described them as the best lineup she has ever played with. Nicole Atkins & The Black Sea is planning to do an extensive amount of touring for the promotion of the new album.

== Critical reception ==
Professional ratings
Review scores
| Source | Rating |
|---|---|
| Allmusic | 4/5 stars |
| BLARE Magazine | 3.5/5 stars |
| Creative Loafing | (positive) |
| Metromix | (positive) |
| Los Angeles Times | (positive) |
| Paste | (7.9/10) |
| Rolling Stone | 3/5 stars |
| Sentimentalist Magazine | (positive) |
| Spin | 6/10 stars |
| State Press | (4/5) |

Mondo Amore has garnered generally positive reviews from music critics. Andrew Leahey of Allmusic wrote that it "continues the trend by keeping an eye on the past, but it shifts everything forward by one decade, mining blues-rock and late-‘60s psychedelia instead of Brill Building pop" and noticed that it "may work best as a companion piece to Neptune City [...] but it’s got more than enough raw emotion to hold its own weight". China Reevers of Paste felt that "the songs play like anthems, commanding you to sing along as her lyrics tell a long-awaited story" and complimented the effortless blending of rock, blues, country and soul. Joshua Khan from BLARE Magazine wrote that Mondo Amore "outlines a bruised heart, telling stories through stripped down blues rock, adult contemporary pop and a bit of southern twang", while Alex Biese of Metromix called it "a gripping, complex record made of dark corridors and broken hearts". Carrie Alison of Sentimentalist Magazine wrote that the album "plunges any willing listener straight into the maelstrom of Atkins’ own Blue Valentine with oftentimes harrowing — but always thoroughly enchanting — results" and called it "the kind of ultra-poignant gem that you pray to come in contact with just to pay it forward". Matthew Leung of State Press felt that "with Mondo Amore, Nicole Atkins has really shown her strength as both a singer and songwriter" and noticed that "her awesome vocals and meaningful lyrics help give this album lasting appeal". Jeff Hahne from Creative Loafing wrote that the album is filled with "hints of Americana and rock while still gleaning from blues and pop" and found it "more upbeat than her debut, showing both growth and versatility".

August Brown of Los Angeles Times described the album as "sturdy, well-arranged pop that old crooners and hipster blues brothers alike can claim as theirs", while Jonah Weiner from Rolling Stone called it "dreamy, vaguely melancholic, thoroughly pleasant". Mikael Wood of Spin praised Atkins' voice but noted that "on the follow-up to 2007's terrific Neptune City, Atkins trades that album's lush torch-song vibe for scrappier indie-garage arrangements that drain much of the drama and romance from her music".

== Uses In Media ==
The song "Vultures" was used in the Dexter (TV series) Season 8 promo.

== Track listing ==
1. "Vultures"
2. "Cry Cry Cry"
3. "Hotel Plaster"
4. "You Come to Me"
5. "My Baby Don't Lie"
6. "This Is for Love"
7. "You Were the Devil"
8. "War Is Hell"
9. "Heavy Boots"
10. "The Tower"
