= To Win or to Lose =

To Win or To Lose

Studio album by The Pine Hill Haints
- Released: 2009
- Genre: Alabama ghost music, bluegrass, folk, honky tonk, country
- Length: 45:02
- Label: K Records

The Pine Hill Haints chronology
Ghost Dance (2007)	To Win or To Lose (2009)	Spidder#14 (2009)

To Win or To Lose is the second studio album by The Pine Hill Haints.

== Track listing ==
=== Side A ===
1. "Intro" (Jamie) –
2. "Not So Lucky and the Invisible Kid" (Jamie) –
3. "Charley Horse" (Jamie) –
4. "Bordello Blackwidow" (Matt) -
5. "Scar" (Jamie) -
6. "Halloween-Time All the Time" (Jamie) -
7. "Never Cry" (Jamie) -
8. "Revenge of the SpiderWeb Boy" (Jamie) -
9. "Je Passe Devant ta Porte" (Traditional) -

=== Side B ===
1. "Never Gonna Die" (Matt) -
2. "My Bones are Gonna Rise Again" (Matt) -
3. "How Much Poison Does It Take" (Jamie) -
4. "The Rangers Command" (Traditional) -
5. "Screaming Jenny" (Matt) -
6. "Doublehead" (Jamie) -
7. "You Are My Thief" (Jamie) -

== Personnel ==
The Pine Hill Haints are

- Jamie Barrier - Guitar, Fiddle
- Matt Bakula - Bucket, Banjo
- Ben Rhyne - Snare
- Katie Kat - Washboard. Mandolin, Saw
- Mike Posey - accordion
- Joey Barrier - Banjo
