= Act of Congress (music group) =

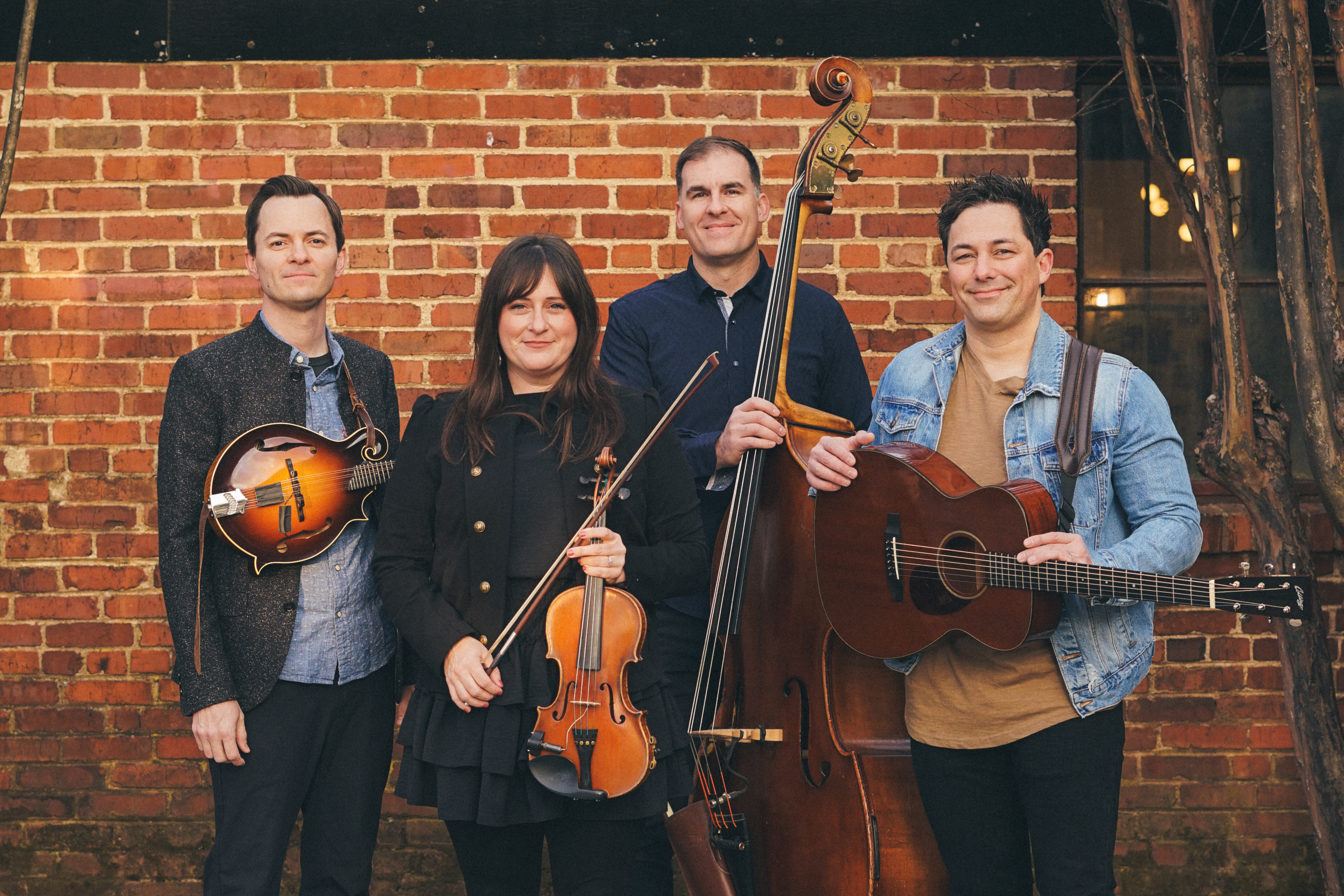

Background information
- Origin: Birmingham, Alabama
- Genres: Folk, acoustic, Newgrass
- Years active: 2006-present
- Label: Residence Music / Centricity Music
- Members: Connie Skellie; Chris Griffin; Tim Carroll Jr. Adam Wright
- Past members: Bethany Borg
- Website: actofcongressmusic.com

Act of Congress is a Birmingham, Alabama based singer-songwriter group. Their sound is a unique blend of pop, folk, gospel, and progressive bluegrass. Their first performance of the debut album Declaration sold out at WorkPlay Theater in Birmingham in 2008.

== History ==
The group's founding members, Chris Griffin and Adam Wright, met while students at the University of Montevallo. Wright, a pianist and mandolin player, and Griffin, a guitar player, were interested in converging the sounds of progressive bluegrass with pop melodies on acoustic instruments. In 2006, upright bass player, Tim Carroll, and violinist, Bethany Borg, were added to the team. In 2009 violinist, Connie Skellie, replaced Borg, solidifying the band's musical identity. Act of Congress has played alongside several Symphonies, including the Alabama Symphony Orchestra in their annual "An Alabama Christmas" concert. On October 17, 2014, Act of Congress played with the Alabama Symphony Orchestra.

In April 2024, Act of Congress released a project called "The Hymns That Made Us." The album features fresh acoustic arrangements of ten timeless Christian hymns.

== Discography ==
- Love Remains EP - March 13, 2008
- Declaration - September 5, 2008
- Cover Up EP - October 1, 2009
- Christmas Vol. 1 EP - November 24, 2011
- Worth Fighting For - March 27, 2012
- The Christmas Collection - November 4, 2016
- The Hymns That Made Us - April 26, 2024
