= Erin Rae =

American folk pop band

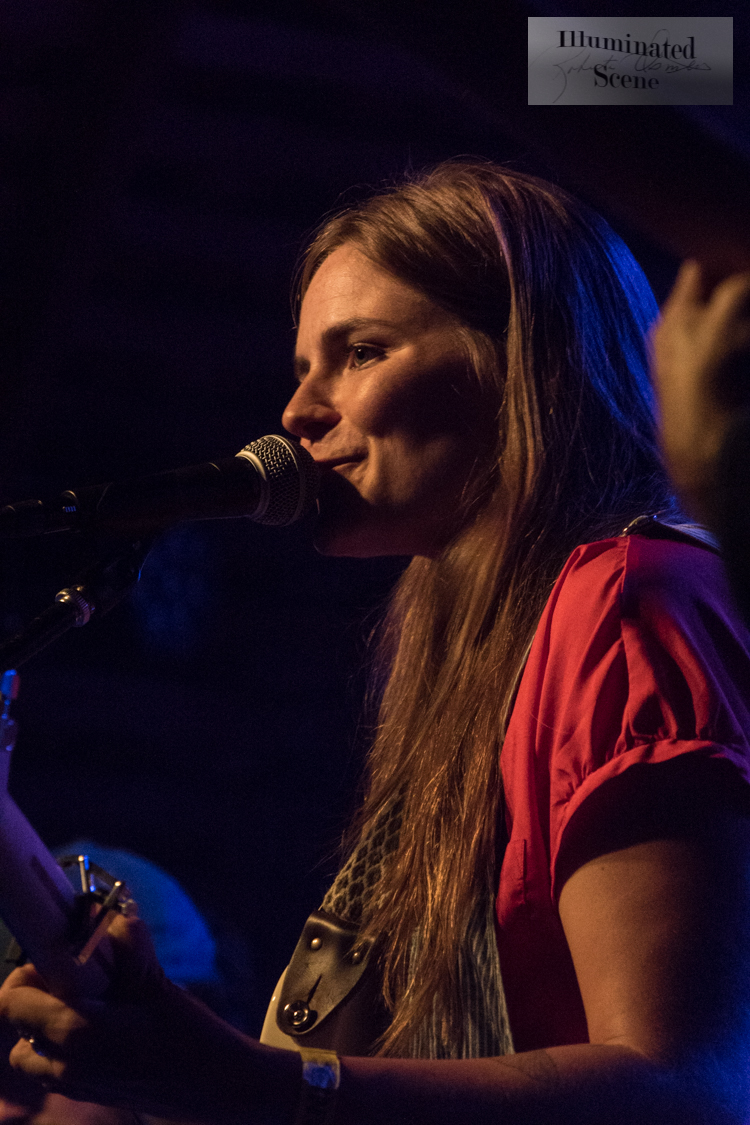
- Rae in 2018.

Background information
- Origin: Nashville, Tennessee, U.S.
- Genres: Folk pop; indie pop
- Years active: 2012–present
- Labels: Single Lock
- Members: Erin Rae McKaskle; Cori LeCain; Graham Bechler
- Website: www.erinraemusic.com

Erin Rae (formerly a part of Erin Rae & the Meanwhiles) is an American folk pop musician from Nashville, Tennessee.

According to Rolling Stone, Erin Rae "makes smooth-edged music for Sunday afternoons" and "her arrangements — anchored by pedal-steel guitar and the steady strum of an acoustic guitar — may be rooted in modern-day indie folk, but the songs themselves rustle up comparisons to Joni Mitchell and Jackson Browne".

== History ==
Erin Rae began her singer/songwriter career as Erin Rae and the Meanwhiles in 2012 with the release of an EP titled Crazy Talk. In 2015, Erin Rae released her debut full-length album with The Meanwhiles titled Soon Enough. The album was recorded in only two days.

In July 2015, Erin Rae and the Meanwhiles recorded a Daytrotter session at Big Light Studio in Nashville.

Erin Rae's second full-length album, Putting On Airs, was released in June 2018.

In 2021 she as a solo artist was inter alia part of the Newport Folk Festival in July.

Erin Rae released her third full-length album, Lighten Up, in February 2022, followed by a live album, Lighten Up & Try: Live & From The Heart, in August 2023.

She was featured on Tyler Childers' album, Rustin’ in the Rain, released in September 2023.

== Collaborators ==
- Gerard G. “Jerry” Bernhardt III (production, Guitar, bass, vocals)
- Dominic Billet (drums, bass, vocals)
- Kevin Morby

== Past collaborators ==
- Cori Bechler (vocals)
- Graham Bechler (drums)
- Kevin Whitsett (bass)
- Brett Resnick (steel)
- Mark Sloan (electric guitar)
- Mark Fredson (keys)
- Kristin Weber (fiddle, vocals)
- Molly Parden (vocals)

== Discography ==
=== Albums ===
Year	Album	Type
2015	"Soon Enough"	Studio
2018	"Putting On Airs"	Studio
2022	"Lighten Up"	Studio
2023	"Lighten Up & Try (Live & From The Heart)"	Live

=== EPs ===
Year	EP
2012	"Crazy Talk"
2019	"Putting On Airs: 4 Track Demos"
2019	"Lagniappe Session"
2022	"Erin Rae: OurVinyl Sessions"
2024	"Lagniappe Session (Second Session)"

=== Singles ===
Year	Single	Album
2016	"Playing Old Games"	Non Album Singles
2019	"Gold Plated"	Non Album Singles
2020	"Christmas Starts Tonight"	Non Album Singles
2021	"Back In Baby's Arms"	Non Album Singles
2021	"True Love's Face"	Lighten Up
2021	"Modern Woman"	Lighten Up
2021	"Candy & Curry"	Lighten Up
2022	"Cosmic Sigh"	Lighten Up
2022	"Rich Man"	Non Album Singles
2023	"Passing Through"	Non Album Singles
2024	"Early Blue"	Non Album Singles
2024	"On Her Side"	Non Album Singles
