= Hotel (band) =

American rock band

- Origin: Birmingham, Alabama, United States
- Genres: Album-oriented rock
- Years active: 1973–1982
- Labels: Mercury; MCA
- Members: Tommy Calton; Lee Bargeron; Mike Reid; Michael Cadenhead
- Past members: Marc Phillips; George Creasman; Beverly Raspberry Owen; Alice Catanzano Bargeron; Tim Townley; Joe Breckinridge; John Nuckols; Eddie Usher; Mark Smith; Jim Pollard; Van Neff

Hotel was an album-oriented rock band from Birmingham, Alabama that was active from 1973 to 1982.

== Early history ==
The band solidified its lineup in 1976 with original members Marc Phillips (lead vocals/piano) and Tommy Calton (guitar/vocals). The most notable formation included Lee Bargeron (keyboards/acoustic guitar/vocals), Mike Reid (guitar/vocals), George Creasman (bass/vocals), and Michael Cadenhead (drums/vocals).

Hotel was a popular band on the southeastern United States rock club circuit, performing in major venues and opening for national acts during the mid-to-late 1970s. Their music featured complex vocal harmonies and a sound reminiscent of power pop groups like The Rascals and Raspberries, but with a more polished musical approach.

== Recordings ==
In 1978, Hotel released the single "You'll Love Again" on Mercury Records, which reached No. 71 on the Billboard Hot 100.

The band signed with MCA Records in 1979 and released their self-titled debut album. The album included singles "You've Got Another Thing Coming" (No. 54) and "Hold On To The Night" (No. 80), the latter co-written with songwriter Barry Mann.

Their second album, Half-Moon Silver, was released in 1980 and featured a more edgy AOR sound. The title track single reached No. 72 on the Hot 100. However, the album's lack of promotion led MCA to drop the band, and Hotel disbanded in 1982.

== Later careers ==
Founding members Marc Phillips and Tommy Calton formed the Calton-Phillips Group, later renamed Split the Dark. The group won the MTV Basement Tapes competition in 1986 and disbanded in 1988.

Guitarist Damon Johnson, a later member of Split the Dark, went on to form the rock group Brother Cane and later played with Alice Cooper, Thin Lizzy, and Black Star Riders.

== Member deaths ==
George Creasman died on June 9, 2020, at age 67.

Marc Phillips died on January 21, 2021, at age 66 from COVID-19.
