= St. Paul and The Broken Bones =

American soul band

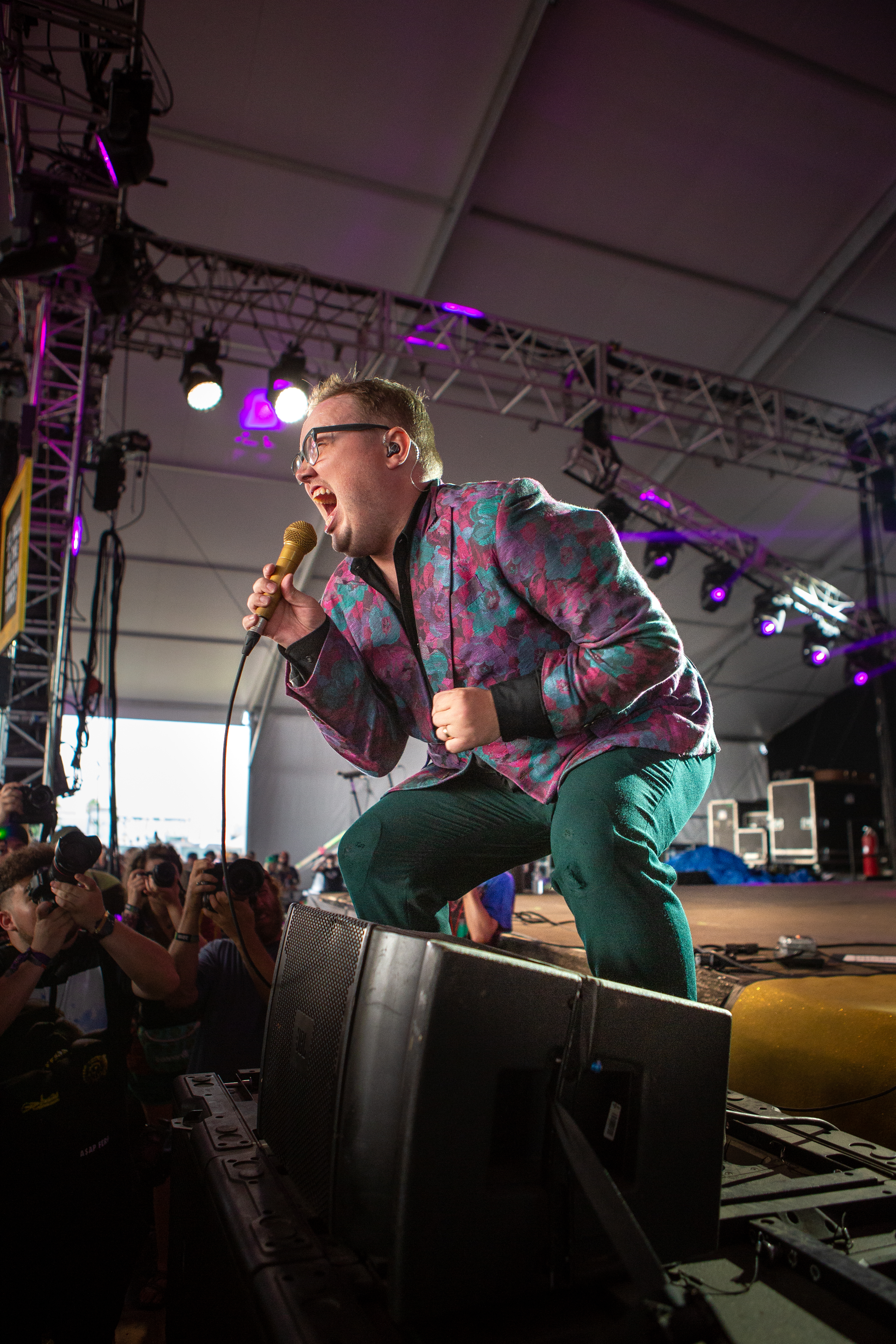
- Paul Janeway at Bonnaroo 2018

Background information
- Origin: Birmingham, Alabama, United States
- Genres: Southern soul; soul
- Years active: 2012–present
- Labels: RECORDS; Single Lock; ATO
- Members: Paul Janeway; Jesse Phillips; Browan Lollar; Kevin Leon; Al Gamble; Allen Branstetter; Amari Ansari; Chad Fisher
- Past members: Ben Griner; James Brangle; Jamison Harper; Andrew Lee; Jason Mingledorff
- Website: stpaulandthebrokenbones.com

St. Paul and The Broken Bones is an American eight-piece soul band based in Birmingham, Alabama, United States, that formed in 2012. The band is composed of Paul Janeway (vocals), Browan Lollar (guitar), Jesse Phillips (bass), Kevin Leon (drums), Al Gamble (keys), Allen Branstetter (trumpet), Amari Ansari (saxophone), and Chad Fisher (trombone). They have released five albums and two EPs while touring internationally.

== History ==
Vocalist Paul Janeway and bassist Jesse Phillips met in the mid-2000s while playing in Birmingham as part of the alternative soul outfit The Secret Dangers. In 2012, Jesse and Paul met back in Ol' Elegante Studios in Birmingham to start a new project. Janeway says of the project with Phillips, "It was going to be our last hurrah" before focusing on other careers, "but then something just clicked and we walked out of there with something." As the two began working around Janeway's voice, they realized they were forming a soul outfit. As the project progressed, the pair brought in Browan Lollar, formerly of The 400 Unit, Andrew Lee, Ben Griner, and Allen Branstetter. Here, they recorded their first EP, Greetings from St. Paul and The Broken Bones before ever playing a live show.

After releasing Greetings from St. Paul and The Broken Bones, the band gained attention from managers and labels alike. In January 2013, they began recording their first full-length album, Half the City, at the Nutthouse Recording Studios Sheffield, Alabama and Fame Studios in Muscle Shoals, Alabama. While recording the album, the band brought in Al Gamble to play keys. Gamble continued to play with St. Paul and The Broken Bones and has been a full-time member since January 2014. Half the City was produced by Ben Tanner of the Alabama Shakes.

In February 2013, St. Paul and The Broken Bones gained the attention of Traci Thomas of Thirty Tigers, who signed on as their manager. Shortly thereafter, they began weekend touring on their Greetings from St. Paul and The Broken Bones EP, waiting for the horn players to graduate college before embarking on more extensive touring.

On February 18, 2014, the LP was released under Single Lock Records, a Florence, Alabama-based record label owned by Ben Tanner, Will Trapp, and John Paul White of The Civil Wars. Immediately, Half the City received critical acclaim from many national journalistic outlets including Paste magazine, Garden and Gun, Southern Living, Rolling Stone, and NPR. In its first week of sales, Half the City reached #62 on the Billboard 200 charts. After major stories by NPR Morning Edition and a national television debut on CBS This Morning: Saturday, St. Paul and The Broken Bones' debut album reached #56 on the Billboard 200. St. Paul and the Broken Bones has also made television appearances on Late Night with David Letterman, The Late Show with Stephen Colbert, Jimmy Kimmel Live, Conan, Later... with Jools Holland, Late Night with Seth Meyers, The Late Late Show with Craig Ferguson, Austin City Limits, and Bluegrass Underground. In addition to their own tour, the band opened for The Rolling Stones' Zip Code Tour in Atlanta, Georgia on June 9, 2015, and in Buffalo, New York on July 11, 2015. The group also made appearances at marquee festivals like Coachella, Bonnaroo, Lollapalooza, Newport Folk, Lockn' Festival, Outside Lands, North Sea Jazz, Rock En Seine, Pinkpop, Hurricane festival, Roskilde, Osheaga, Hyde Park London, and more. On top of that, they performed "All I Ever Wonder" live on BBC2 from the Glastonbury Festival on June 25, 2016. Some of the groups more notable events played are Elton John's AIDS Foundation Oscar viewing party in Los Angeles, Philip Glass' Tibet House Benefit in New York, The Equal Justice Initiative's 30th Anniversary celebration, and a Carnegie Hall series curated by Rosanne Cash.

St. Paul and the Broken Bones songs have also featured in movie and TV spots such as Los Angeles, Grey's Anatomy, Big Little Lies, Suits, Black Lightning, ESPN, Fifty Shades of Grey, Life of the Party, The Gambler, Mob Wives, Stitchers, and Switched at Birth.

In May 2015, trombonist Ben Griner left the group to work on personal projects. Their second album Sea of Noise was released in September 2016. In 2017, they were nominated for a Daytime Emmy Award for Outstanding Musical Performance.

The band released a single, "Apollo", in June 2018, and announced an album, Young Sick Camellia, released in September. The major theme of the album is Janeway's relationships with his father and grandfather. About the album's lyrics he said, “I was dwelling on my family and the complexity to all the men’s relationships. My papaw was not a warm person, but he showed his affection through hard work. He and my father had a complicated relationship and didn’t communicate well. This record is about me growing up in a digital age, and my father and papaw growing up in their different times, and exploring the dynamics of those relationships.” After the recording of the album, saxophone player Jason Mingledorff left the band and was replaced by Amari Ansari. Kevin Leon also replaced Andrew Lee on drums before the release of the album. In 2018, Paul Janeway was featured on the title cut of Sigala's album Brighter Days.

In 2021, St. Paul and the Broken Bones announced they had signed with ATO Records. Their first release for their new label, The Alien Coast, followed in January 2022 and was well received by critics. The sound of the new album was a departure from their previous releases, incorporating elements of psychedelic rock, stoner metal, and hip-hop inspired beats with the funk and soul sounds for which they'd become known. Janeway has said that Greek mythology and dystopian sci-fi were some of the inspirations for the album.

In anticipation of the birth of his daughter Marigold in September 2020, Janeway wrote a series of letters to his child. These deeply personal letters became the songs featured on the band's latest album Angels in Science Fiction, released in April 2023. While continuing the musical experimentation found in the band's other recent records, the album has more quiet, minimalist moments than their other releases, with some songs featuring nothing more than Janeway's voice and an acoustic guitar.

The band has a star on the wall of historic music venue First Avenue in Minneapolis.

Janeway, as St. Paul, released a solo single, "Colder", in February 2024.

== Discography ==
=== Albums ===
==== Studio albums ====
Title	Details	Peak chart positions									
Title	Details	US	US Indie	US Rock	BEL (FL)	NL	SCO	UK Sales	UK Amer.	UK Indie	UK R&B
Half the City	Released: February 18, 2014; Label: Single Lock; Format: Digital download, CD, Vinyl	56	12	9	53	50	—	—	—	17	9
Sea of Noise	Released: September 9, 2016; Label: Records; Format: Digital download, CD, Vinyl	44	14	9	134	133	77	73	4	—	—
Young Sick Camellia	Released: September 7, 2018; Label: Records; Format: Digital download, CD, Vinyl	56	7	—	—	—	—	82	4	—	—
The Alien Coast	Released: January 28, 2022; Label: ATO; Format: Digital download, CD, Vinyl	— (Note: The Alien Coast did not enter the Billboard 200, but peaked at number 16 on the US Top Album Sales chart.)	45	45	—	—	—	—	15	48	—
Angels in Science Fiction	Released: April 21, 2023; Label: ATO; Format: Digital download, CD, Vinyl	— (Note: Angels in Science Fiction did not enter the Billboard 200, but peaked at number 87 on the US Top Album Sales chart.)	—	—	—	—	—	—	—	—	—
St. Paul & the Broken Bones	Released: October 10, 2025; Label: Oasis Pizza; Format: Digital download, CD, Vinyl	—	—	—	—	—	—	—	19	41	—
"—" denotes a recording that did not chart or was not released in that territory.

==== Live ====
Title	Details
Spotify Sessions (Live at SXSW 2014)	Released: 2014; Label: Single Lock; Format: Streaming

=== Extended plays ===
Title	Details
St. Paul and The Broken Bones - Live and In Person	Released: 2013; Single Lock; Format: Streaming
Greetings from St. Paul and The Broken Bones	Released: 2014; Label: Self-release; Format: N/A

=== Singles ===
Title	Year	Peak chart positions				Album
Title	Year	US AAA	US Rock Air	ICE	MEX Eng.	Album
"Call Me"	2014	6	—	—	—	Half the City
"All I Ever Wonder"	2016	16	—	—	36	Sea of Noise
"Flow with It (You Got Me Feeling Like)"	2016	—	—	—	40	Sea of Noise
"Is It Me"	2016	—	—	—	—	Sea of Noise
"Midnight on Earth"	2016	—	—	—	—	Sea of Noise
"Convex"	2018	—	—	—	—	Young Sick Camellia
"Apollo"	2018	3	44	36	—	Young Sick Camellia
"GotItBad"	2019	31	—	—	—	Young Sick Camellia
"The Last Dance"	2021	16	—	—	—	The Alien Coast
"3000 AD Mass"	2021	—	—	—	—	The Alien Coast
"Love Letter From a Red Roof Inn"	2021	—	—	—	—	The Alien Coast
"Minotaur"	2022	—	—	—	—	The Alien Coast
"Sea Star"	2023	—	—	—	—	Angels in Science Fiction
"Sushi and Coca-Cola"	2025	1	39	—	—	St. Paul and the Broken Bones
"Fall Moon"	2025	3	—	—	—	St. Paul and the Broken Bones
"Proxy"	2026	19	—	—	—	Proxy EP
"—" denotes singles that did not chart or were not released
