= Auburn Knights Orchestra =

Music group founded in 1930

The Auburn Knights Orchestra
- Formation: September 1930; 95 years ago
- Type: Big Band
- Location(s): Auburn, Alabama, United States

The Auburn Knights Orchestra is a big band founded at Auburn University in 1930. They perform jazz music, among other genres, at locations throughout the southeastern United States.

== History ==
The group was founded in 1930 during the Great Depression in the United States. The members travelled by tour bus to performance locations.

In 1959, then Auburn University student Toni Tennille performed in the group. Her father Frank Tenille was one of its founding members.

In 1991, former members organized a reunion that featured multiple bands with members from each decade of the group's existence, with each decade's band performing music from that time. The effort grew into an annual event hosted and presented by the Auburn Knights Alumni Association, a nonprofit founded in 1986.

The group was given tax exempt status by the IRS in 2009.
