= Belle Adair (band) =

American indie rock band

Background information
- Origin: Florence, Alabama, United States
- Genre: Indie rock
- Years active: 2011–present
- Label: Single Lock Records
- Members: Matt Green; Reed Watson; Adam Morrow; Hayden Crawford
- Website: belleadairmusic.com

Belle Adair is a five-piece indie rock band based out of Florence, Alabama, United States, which formed in 2011. In 2013, they released The Brave and the Blue, garnering critical acclaim from Spin, American Songwriter, Paste Magazine and the Austin Chronicle.

They will release their second album, Tuscumbia, on January 19, 2018. It was recorded at FAME Studios and mixed at Wilco's Loft Studio in Chicago.

== History ==
The band was founded in 2011 by Matt Green and Ben Tanner (Alabama Shakes). The band independently released their self-titled EP later that year. In 2013, Tanner helped establish Single Lock Records, involving the band from the start and giving it a home to release The Brave and the Blue.

After a lineup change in early 2014, the group began work on a new record entitled Tuscumbia in the winter of 2015. It will be released in 2018 on Single Lock Records.

The band consists of Matt Green (principal songwriter, vocalist and guitarist), Reed Watson (drums), Adam Morrow (guitar, vocals) and Hayden Crawford (bass guitar).

Belle Adair opened select shows for Alabama Shakes in 2015 and 2016. They have since acted as John Paul White's backing band, currently touring throughout the United States and Europe.

== Discography ==
=== Albums ===
- The Brave and the Blue (Single Lock Records, 2013)
- Tuscumbia (Single Lock Records, 2018)

=== EPs ===
- Belle Adair (Single Lock Records, 2011)
