= Single Lock Records =

American record label

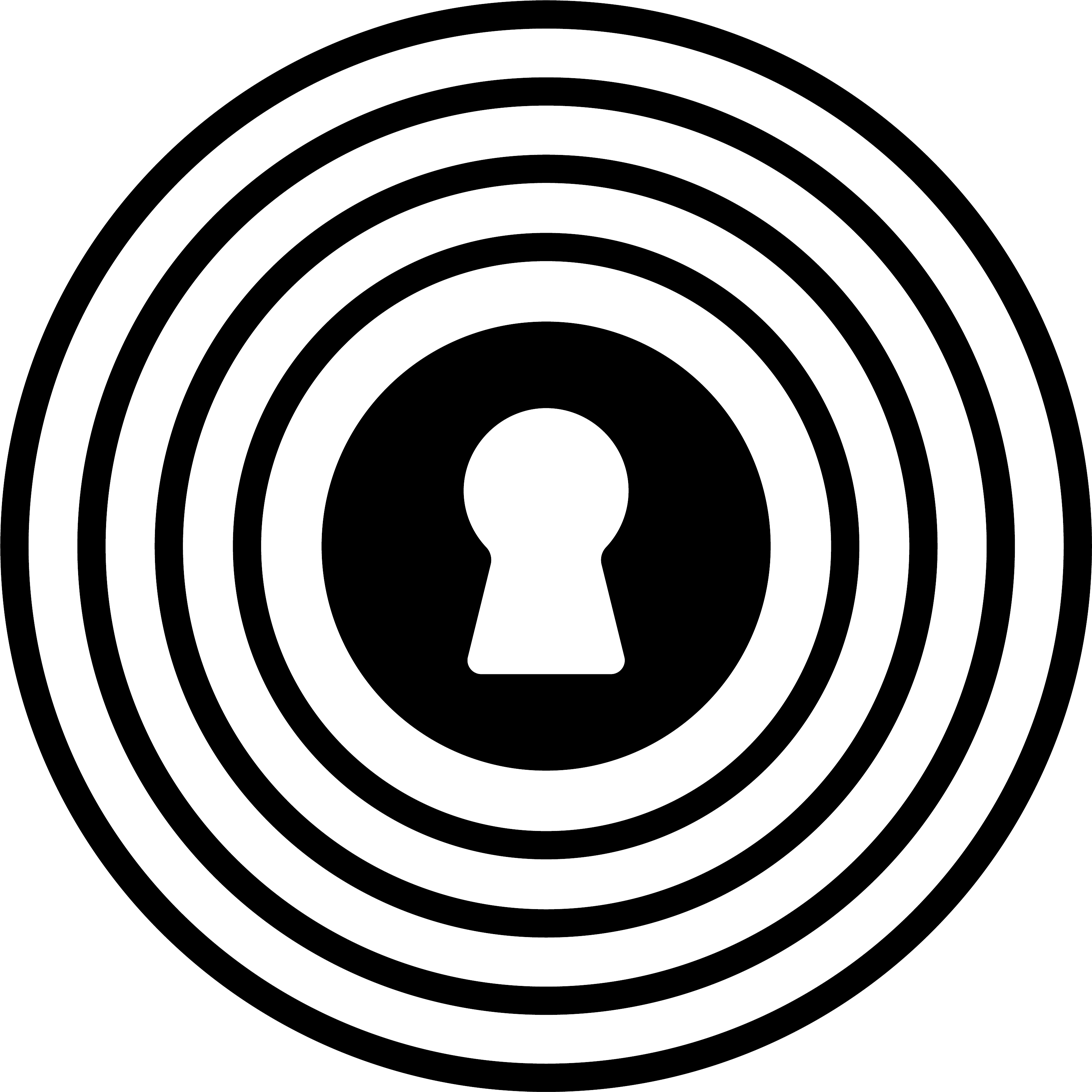
- Founded: 2013
- Country of origin: U.S.
- Location: Florence, Alabama; New Orleans, Louisiana
- Official website: www.singlelock.com

Single Lock Records is an American record label based in Florence, Alabama. It was founded by Ben Tanner (Alabama Shakes), John Paul White and Will Trapp in 2013 to release music from The Shoals region of Alabama, but has since expanded its reach worldwide. Today, the label is overseen by the team of Reed Watson, Ben Tanner and Addy Kimbrell, with offices in Florence, Alabama and New Orleans, Louisiana.

The label saw its first Billboard 200 chart entry in 2014 with the release of Half The City by St. Paul and The Broken Bones. It has released charting records by Cedric Burnside, Dylan LeBlanc, Nicole Atkins, Penny & Sparrow, and John Paul White.

The label saw its first Grammy Award nomination in 2018 when Cedric Burnside's Benton County Relic was nominated for Best Traditional Blues Album at the 61st Annual Grammy Awards.

The label saw its first Americana Award nomination in 2019 when Erin Rae was nominated for Emerging Act of the Year at the 2019 Americana Honors & Awards.

In 2020, The Bitter Southerner wrote about the label, "Single Lock, as a noun, a commodity, a philosophy, is a collection of great music from all influences and sensibilities, music made without narrow boundaries, without dollar-focused directives, and with 100% artist integrity at its core. You don't have to be an A+ music aesthete or discophile to get it."

In 2021, the label earned three Grammy Award nominations for releases by Cedric Burnside, Cha Wa and The Blind Boys of Alabama. Cedric Burnside's "I Be Trying" won Best Traditional Blues Album at the 64th GRAMMY Awards.

== Roster ==
- Nicole Atkins (Nashville, Tennessee)
- The Bear (Florence, Alabama)
- Belle Adair (Florence, Alabama)
- The Blind Boys of Alabama (Talladega, Alabama)
- Cedric Burnside (Holly Springs, Mississippi)
- Cha Wa (New Orleans, Louisiana)
- Mia Dyson (Torquay, Victoria, Australia / Los Angeles, California)
- Caleb Elliott (Shreveport, Louisiana)
- Erin Rae (Nashville, Tennessee)
- Exotic Dangers (Florence, Alabama)
- Donnie Fritts (Florence, Alabama)
- Duquette Johnston (Birmingham, Alabama)
- The Kernal (Jackson, Tennessee)
- Dylan LeBlanc (Florence, Alabama)
- Lera Lynn (Nashville, Tennessee)
- Penny & Sparrow (Florence, Alabama)
- The Pine Hill Haints (Florence, Alabama)
- The Pollies (Florence, Alabama)
- The Prescriptions (Nashville, Tennessee)
- Rock Eupora (Nashville, Tennessee)
- Steelism (Nashville, Tennessee)
- Space Tyger (Florence, Alabama)
- Speckled Bird (Florence, Alabama)
- St. Paul and The Broken Bones (Birmingham, Alabama)
- John Paul White (Florence, Alabama)
