= The Civil Wars discography =

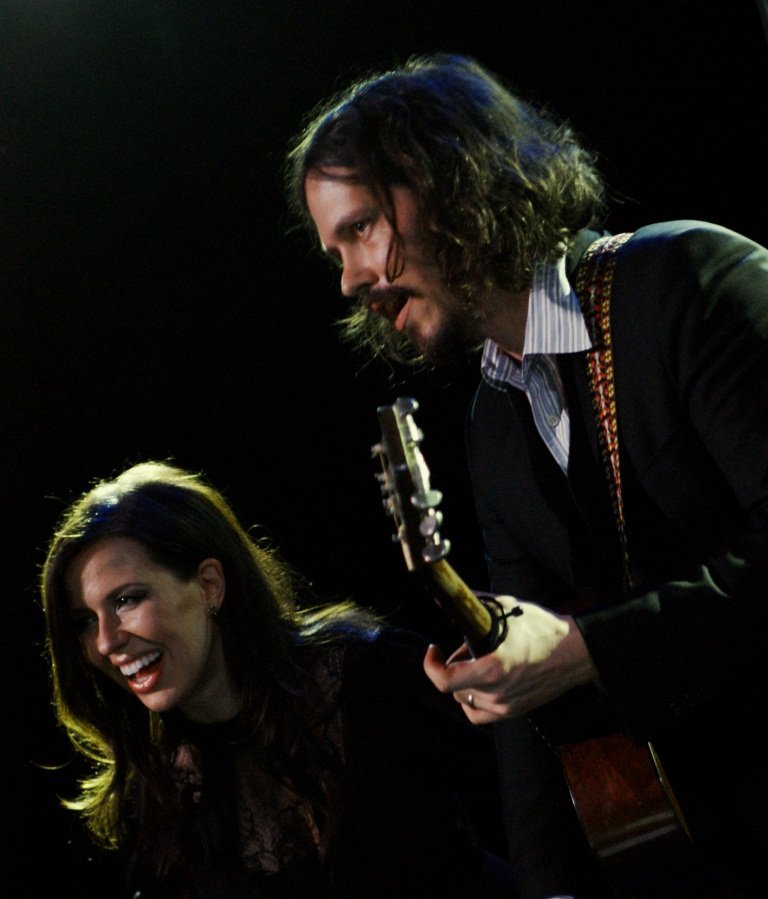
- The Civil Wars in 2012
- Studio albums: 2
- Extended plays: 4
- Live albums: 5
- Singles: 8
- Music videos: 6

The discography of the Civil Wars consists of two studio albums, four extended plays (EP), five live albums, eight singles, and six music videos. The material has been released by Sensibility Music, LLC.

The Civil Wars was a group composed of singer-songwriters Joy Williams and John Paul White. Their debut studio album, Barton Hollow, was produced by Charlie Peacock and was released on February 1, 2011. It peaked at number 10 on the US Billboard 200 chart in the United States and garnered the top spot of the US Independent Albums and US Top Folk Albums. It became the number 1 downloaded album on iTunes the same week of its released. It also reached the charts in Canada and the United Kingdom. The title track, "Barton Hollow", which was released in 2011, failed to chart on US Billboard Hot 100 but peaked at number 1 on the Bubbling Under Hot 100 Singles.

Barton Hollow album and the title track won the Best Folk Album and the Best Country Duo/Group Performance at the 54th Grammy Awards in 2012, respectively.

== Albums ==
=== Studio albums ===
List of studio albums, with selected chart positions, sales, and certifications
Title	Album details	Peak chart positions									Certifications	Sales
Title	Album details	US	US Folk	US Indie	US Rock	CAN	AUS	IRL	NZ	UK	Certifications	Sales
Barton Hollow	Released: February 1, 2011; Label: Sensibility Music; Formats: CD, LP, digital download	10	1	1	2	16	—	26	40	13	RIAA: Gold; BPI: Gold; MC: Gold	US: 623,000
The Civil Wars	Released: August 6, 2013; Label: Sensibility Music/Columbia; Formats: CD, LP, digital download	1	1	—	1	1	35	3	16	2	RIAA: Gold	US: 222,000
"—" denotes a recording that did not chart or was not released in that territory.

=== Live albums ===
List of live albums, with selected chart positions
Title	Album details	Peak chart positions			
Title	Album details	US	US Folk	US Indie	US Rock
Live at Eddie's Attic	Released: June 30, 2009; Label: Sensibility Music; Formats: LP, digital download	—	7	—	—
iTunes Live: SXSW	Released: March 19, 2011; Label: Sensibility Music; Formats: digital download	—	7	—	—
Live @ Sundance	Released: March 3, 2012; Label: Sensibility Music; Formats: Digital download	—	—	—	—
Live at Amoeba	Released: April 21, 2012; Label: Sensibility Music; Formats: CD, digital download	—	16	—	—
Unplugged on VH1	Released: January 15, 2013; Label: Sensibility Music; Formats: LP, digital download	34	4	7	9
"—" denotes a recording that did not chart or was not released in that territory.

=== Soundtrack albums ===
List of soundtrack albums, with selected chart positions
Title	Album details	Peak chart positions	
Title	Album details	US Folk	US Indie
A Place at the Table (Original Motion Picture Soundtrack) with T Bone Burnett	Released: March 1, 2013; Label: Sensibility Music; Formats: CD, LP, digital download	12	50

== Extended plays ==
List of extended plays, with selected chart positions
Title	Album details	Peak chart positions		
Title	Album details	US	US Folk	US Rock
Poison & Wine	Released: November 20, 2009; Label: Sensibility Music; Formats: CD, digital download	—	12	—
To Be Determined	Released: August 6, 2013; Label: Sensibility Music; Formats: LP	—	—	—
Bare Bones EP	Released: November 29, 2013; Label: Sensibility Music; Formats: LP, digital download	148	4	29
Between the Bars	Released: February 7, 2014; Label: Sensibility Music; Formats: LP, digital download	60	3	13
"—" denotes a recording that did not chart or was not released in that territory.

== Singles ==
List of singles, with selected chart positions and certifications
Title	Year	Peak chart positions					Certifications	Album
Title	Year	US Bub.	US AAA	US Heat	US Rock	US Rock Digital	Certifications	Album
"Poison & Wine"	2009	—	—	—	—	24	MC: Gold	Poison & Wine
"Barton Hollow"	2011	1	15	12	—	15		Barton Hollow
"Dance Me to the End of Love"	2011	—	—	—	—	—		Barton Hollow
"Birds of a Feather" (Live)	2011	—	—	—	—	—		Barton Hollow
"Billie Jean"	2012	—	—	—	—	—		Barton Hollow
"Kingdom Come"	2012	—	—	—	—	20		The Hunger Games: Songs from District 12 and Beyond
"The One That Got Away"	2013	—	16	—	16	10		The Civil Wars
"Dust to Dust"	2013	—	—	—	21	13		The Civil Wars

== Other charting songs ==
List of singles, with selected chart positions
Title	Year	Peak chart positions		Album
Title	Year	US Rock	US Rock Digital	Album
"Tracks In the Snow"	2011	—	20	Tracks In the Snow
"Same Old Same Old"	2013	46	47	The Civil Wars
"From This Valley"	2013	45	—	The Civil Wars
"You Are My Sunshine"	2014	—	44	Non-album single

== Featured singles ==
Year	Single	Artist	Peak chart positions			Certifications (sales threshold)	Album
Year	Single	Artist	US	CAN	UK	Certifications (sales threshold)	Album
2011	"Safe & Sound"	Taylor Swift	30	31	184	RIAA: 2× Platinum; ARIA: 2× Platinum; BPI: Silver	The Hunger Games: Songs from District 12 and Beyond
2012	"Lily Love"	The Chieftains	—	—	—		Voice of Ages

== Music videos ==
Year	Video	Director
2009	"Poison & Wine"	Becky Fluke
2010	"Barton Hollow"	Becky Fluke
2012	"Safe & Sound" (with Taylor Swift)	Philip Andelman
2013	"The One That Got Away"	Mark Slagle
2013	"Same Old Same Old"	
2013	"Dust to Dust"	Mark Slagle
