= Joy Williams =

Joy Williams may refer to:

- Joy Williams (Australian writer) (1942–2006), Australian poet
- Joy Williams (American writer) (born 1944), American fiction writer
- Joy Williams (singer) (born 1982), American musician
  - Joy Williams (album), the singer's 2001 debut album
- Joy Ann Williams (1961–2016), American immunologist
