= The Hunger Games: Songs from District 12 and Beyond =

Soundtrack album by various artists
- Released: March 20, 2012
- Recorded: 2011–2012
- Genres: Folk rock; country; alternative rock
- Length: 58:10
- Labels: Republic; Mercury
- Producer: T Bone Burnett

Singles from The Hunger Games: Songs from District 12 and Beyond
- 1. "Eyes Open" Released: March 27, 2012

Professional ratings
Aggregate scores
Source	Rating
Metacritic	72/100
Review scores
Source	Rating
Allmusic	4/5 stars
Entertainment Weekly	B
Rolling Stone	3/5 stars
Slant Magazine	4/5 stars

The Hunger Games: Songs from District 12 and Beyond is the soundtrack album to the 2012 film The Hunger Games. The score for the film was composed by James Newton Howard, but the companion album consists primarily of songs by various artists inspired by, but not heard in, the film. "Safe & Sound", by Taylor Swift featuring The Civil Wars, was released as a promotional single for the soundtrack and is one of the three songs on the album used in the film, alongside "Abraham's Daughter" by Arcade Fire and "Kingdom Come", also by The Civil Wars. On February 13, 2012, "One Engine" by The Decemberists, was made available for download on iTunes. "Eyes Open", also by Swift, was released as the soundtrack's first official single on March 27, 2012. Swift performed the song live in Auckland, New Zealand on her Speak Now World Tour. The album debuted atop the U.S. Billboard 200 chart, and has also charted in the United Kingdom, New Zealand, Australia, and Ireland.

== Promotion ==
The soundtrack was released on March 20, 2012. The soundtrack track listing was revealed on iTunes on February 13, 2012. Jennifer Lawrence singing "Rue's Lullaby" is not included in the soundtrack. "One Engine" by The Decemberists was released as the first promotional single by iTunes on the same day. A bonus song, "Deep in the Meadow (Lullaby)", by Sting, was included as a bonus download with purchase of the soundtrack.

== Charts performance ==
The soundtrack debuted at number 1 on the Billboard 200 with 175,000 copies sold on its first week. It sold 100K digital copies the next week, making it the highest one-week total for a theatrically released movie soundtrack in digital history. It has been certified as Gold by the RIAA since April 27, 2012. It sold 463,000 copies in 2012 in the US and was the best-selling soundtrack album of the year. As of November 22, 2013, the album has sold 481,000 copies in the US.

== Track listing ==
All the tracks are produced by T. Bone Burnett, except where noted

No.	Title	Writer(s)	Producer(s)	Length
1.	"Abraham's Daughter" (Arcade Fire)	T Bone Burnett; Edwin Butler; Régine Alexandra Chassagne		3:22
2.	"Tomorrow Will Be Kinder" (The Secret Sisters)	Laura Rogers; Lydia Rogers		3:25
3.	"Nothing to Remember" (Neko Case)	Case		2:58
4.	"Safe & Sound" (Taylor Swift featuring The Civil Wars)	Burnett; Taylor Alison Swift; John Paul White; Joy Elizabeth Williams		4:00
5.	"The Ruler and the Killer" (Kid Cudi)	Burnet; Scott Mescudi; Greg Wells	Burnett; Mescudi; Wells	4:33
6.	"Dark Days" (Punch Brothers)	Chris Eldridge; Gabriel Witcher; Christopher Thile; Noam David Pikelny; Paul Kowert		3:53
7.	"One Engine" (The Decemberists)	Colin Patrick Henry Maloy		3:01
8.	"Daughter's Lament" (Carolina Chocolate Drops)	Rhiannon Giddens		2:46
9.	"Kingdom Come" (The Civil Wars)	White; Williams		3:42
10.	"Take the Heartland" (Glen James Hansard)	Hansard		2:45
11.	"Come Away to the Water" (Maroon 5 featuring Rozzi Crane)	Hansard		5:13
12.	"Run Daddy Run" (Miranda Lambert featuring Pistol Annies)	Lambert; Angaleena Presley; Ashley Monroe		2:45
13.	"Rules" (Jayme Dee)	Megan Keeley; Brandon Keeley		3:27
14.	"Eyes Open" (Swift)	Swift	Nathan Chapman; Swift	4:04
15.	"Lover Is Childlike" (The Low Anthem)	Ben Knox Miller; Jocelyn Adams; Jeffrey Prystowsky		4:15
16.	"Just a Game" (Birdy)	Jasmine van den Bogaerde		4:01
Total length:				58:10

=== iTunes digital album ===
A digital version of the album, available for purchase on iTunes, includes a digital booklet with artwork and images from The Hunger Games.

=== Grammy and Golden Globe nominations ===
The songs "Abraham's Daughter" and "Safe & Sound" were nominated for the 2013 Grammy Awards; the first for Best Song Written for Visual Media, and the second for both Best Country Duo/Group Performance and Best Song Written for Visual Media, the latter of which ended up winning. "Safe & Sound" was also nominated for the Golden Globe Award for Best Original Song at the 2013 ceremony.

== Charts and certifications ==
=== Weekly charts ===
Chart (2012)	Peak position
Australian Albums (ARIA)	14
Austrian Albums (Ö3 Austria)	61
Belgian Albums (Ultratop Flanders)	62
Belgian Albums (Ultratop Wallonia)	91
Canadian Albums (Billboard)	5
French Albums (SNEP)	168
German Albums (Offizielle Top 100)	69
Irish Albums (IRMA)	4
Mexican Albums (Top 100 Mexico)	60
New Zealand Albums (RMNZ)	13
Norwegian Albums (VG-lista)	32
UK Compilation Albums (Official Charts)	16
US Billboard 200	1
US Top Rock Albums (Billboard)	1
US Soundtrack Albums (Billboard)	1

=== Year-end charts ===
Chart (2012)	Position
US Billboard 200	57
US Top Rock Albums (Billboard)	16
US Soundtrack Albums (Billboard)	1

=== Certifications ===
Certifications for The Hunger Games: Songs from District 12
Region	Certification	Certified units/sales
United States (RIAA)	Gold	500,000^{^}
^{^} Shipments figures based on certification alone.
