= Eyes Open (song) =

2012 single by Taylor Swift

Single by Taylor Swift

from the album The Hunger Games: Songs from District 12 and Beyond
- Released: March 27, 2012
- Studio: The Village Recorder (Los Angeles)
- Genre: Alternative rock; power ballad
- Length: 4:04
- Label: Big Machine
- Songwriter: Taylor Swift
- Producers: Taylor Swift; Nathan Chapman

Taylor Swift singles chronology
"Ours" (2011)	"Eyes Open" (2012)	"Both of Us" (2012)

The Hunger Games singles chronology
"Eyes Open" (2012)	"Atlas" (2013)

Lyric video
- "Eyes Open" on YouTube

"Eyes Open" is a song written and recorded by the American singer-songwriter Taylor Swift for the soundtrack to the 2012 film The Hunger Games. Produced by Swift and Nathan Chapman, it is an alternative rock power ballad instrumented with chiming guitars, evoking pop-punk and space rock sounds. The lyrics are about resilience during hardships, told from the perspective of the film's protagonist, Katniss Everdeen. The song was released as a single from the soundtrack on March 27, 2012.

Music critics commented the song's rock sound showcased Swift's expanding artistry beyond her previous country pop songs. At the 2012 Teen Choice Awards, it won Choice Single – Female. "Eyes Open" charted in the top 50 and received certifications in Australia, New Zealand, and the United States. The song additionally charted in Ireland and the United Kingdom. A re-recording titled "Eyes Open (Taylor's Version)" was released on March 17, 2023, as part of Swift's re-recordings of her back catalog, following the 2019 dispute over the ownership of the masters of her first six albums.

== Background and composition ==
Taylor Swift wrote two songs for the soundtrack to the 2012 film The Hunger Games: "Safe & Sound" and "Eyes Open". She wrote the former with the Civil Wars and the latter by herself. According to Swift, "Eyes Open" is about the Hunger Games protagonist Katniss Everdeen's relationship with the Capitol. She described the song as the opposite of the melancholic "Safe & Sound", stating that "[it is] more frantic and fast-paced, a completely different shade of music".

"Eyes Open" is four minutes and four seconds long. It was produced by Swift and Nathan Chapman, and recorded at the Village Recorder in Los Angeles. "Eyes Open" is an alternative rock power ballad, instrumented by dynamic guitar riffs. Billboard's Jason Lipshutz wrote that the song was situated within the "modern rock vein", and USA Today's Brian Mansfield thought that Swift was inspired by her love for pop-punk.

According to Annie Zaleski, "Eyes Open" showcases Swift's "heavy rock 'n' roll persona" and its "lurching guitars and gouging grooves" evoke the styles of space rock bands like Hum and Failure. Told from the perspective of Everdeen, the lyrics depict her defiance to keep her eyes open to watch out for enemies and challenges.

== Release and commercial performance ==
Swift performed an acoustic version of "Eyes Open" at a concert in Auckland on March 17, 2012, as part of her Speak Now World Tour. The song was leaked before its official release date of March 20, 2012, in tandem with the release of the soundtrack; a lyric video was also released. The single was sent to contemporary hit radio in the United States on March 27, 2012, by Big Machine and Republic Records. "Eyes Open" won the Teen Choice Award for Choice Music – Single (Female) at the 2012 Teen Choice Awards. Swift performed "Eyes Open" as part of her acoustic set in the Eras Tour concert at Tokyo show in February 2024.

In the United States, "Eyes Open" entered the Billboard Hot 100 chart at number 19, which was also its peak position. After it was sent to radio, the single debuted on the Pop Songs airplay chart at number 28 and eventually peaked at number 20. In December 2012, "Eyes Open" received a platinum certification from the Recording Industry Association of America for surpassing one million digital copies sold in the United States; it became Swift's sixteenth million-seller and her second from the soundtrack, after "Safe & Sound". By November 2017, the song had sold 1.4 million digital copies in the United States.

Elsewhere, "Eyes Open" charted in various Anglophone territories, at number 17 in Canada, number 47 in Australia, number 65 in Ireland, and number 70 in the United Kingdom. In New Zealand, the song debuted and peaked at number six and was certified gold by Recorded Music NZ.

== Critical reception ==
The song was generally well received by critics, most of whom highlighted its rock-oriented production as a departure from Swift's previous country pop releases. Rob Sheffield of Rolling Stone described it as Swift's "long-overdue metal move". It was selected as one of the soundtrack's standouts by Medoly Lau of CBC Music and Christina Jaleru of the Associated Press, who complimented its lyrics as a double entendre for Everdeen's narrative and celebrity culture at large. Newsday's Glenn Gamboa considered the track a pleasant surprise for featuring Swift's "hardest rock performance" vocally. Screen Rant's Gina Wurtz regarded "Eyes Open" as a showcase of Swift's ability to switch genres and ranked it among her 10 best rock-inspired songs. Allison Stewart of The Washington Post lauded the song as a "perfect inner monologue" of Everdeen. Billboard's Jason Lipshutz praised it as a "clever spin" on the perils of stardom. In a review for The Gazette, Bernard Perusse described "Eyes Open" as an anthem that would be as popular as the film.

In June 2022, Business Insider ranked "Eyes Open" as Swift's third-best soundtrack song, behind "Safe & Sound" (also for The Hunger Games, 2011) and "I Don't Wanna Live Forever" (for Fifty Shades Darker: Original Motion Picture Soundtrack, 2017). Alexis Petridis from The Guardian was less enthusiastic, considering the rock sound of "Eyes Open" a teaser for Swift's more exciting sounds on her forthcoming album Red (2012).

== Personnel ==
Adapted from the liner notes of The Hunger Games: Songs from District 12 and Beyond

- Taylor Swift – producer, writer
- Nathan Chapman – producer, recording
- Chad Carlson – recording
- Jason Wormer – recording
- Jason Campbell – production coordinator
- Mike Piersante – mixing

== Charts ==
Chart performance for "Eyes Open"
Chart (2012)	Peak position
Australia (ARIA)	47
Canada Hot 100 (Billboard)	17
Canada CHR/Top 40 (Billboard)	34
Canada Hot AC (Billboard)	23
Ireland (IRMA)	65
New Zealand (Recorded Music NZ)	6
UK Singles (Official Charts)	70
US Billboard Hot 100	19
US Pop Airplay (Billboard)	20
US Hot Country Songs (Billboard)	50
US Adult Pop Airplay (Billboard)	11
US Adult Contemporary (Billboard)	21

== Certifications ==
Certifications for "Eyes Open"
Region	Certification	Certified units/sales
Australia (ARIA)	Gold	35,000^{‡}
New Zealand (RMNZ)	Gold	7,500^{*}
United States (RIAA)	Platinum	1,000,000^{*}
^{*} Sales figures based on certification alone.^{‡} Sales+streaming figures based on certification alone.

== Release history ==
Release dates and formats for "Eyes Open"
Region	Date	Format	Label(s)	Ref.
United States	March 27, 2012	Mainstream airplay	Big Machine	

== "Eyes Open (Taylor's Version)" ==
"Eyes Open (Taylor's Version)"

Promotional single by Taylor Swift

from the EP The More Red (Taylor's Version) Chapter
- Released: March 17, 2023
- Length: 4:03
- Label: Republic
- Songwriter: Taylor Swift
- Producers: Taylor Swift; Christopher Rowe; Paul Mirkovich

Audio video
- "Eyes Open (Taylor's Version)" on YouTube

On March 17, 2023, Swift released "Eyes Open (Taylor's Version)", a re-recorded version of "Eyes Open", via Republic Records. The song was part of Swift's re-recording plan following the 2019 dispute over the ownership of the masters of her older discography, after the talent manager Scooter Braun acquired Big Machine Records, including the masters of Swift's albums which the label had released. By re-recording the albums, Swift had full ownership of the new masters, which enabled her to control the licensing of her songs for commercial use and therefore substituted the Big Machine–owned masters.

"Eyes Open (Taylor's Version)" was released for streaming and download as an independent track without appearing on any album. It was included on a streaming-only compilation titled The More Red (Taylor's Version) Chapter.

=== Personnel ===
Credits are adapted from Tidal.

- Taylor Swift – vocals, background vocals, songwriter, producer
- Christopher Rowe – producer, vocal engineer
- Paul Mirkovich – producer, executive producer, additional engineer, piano, synthesizer, drum programming
- Derek Garten – engineer, editor
- Travis Ference – editor, recording engineer, additional engineer
- Justin Derrico – recording engineer, additional engineer, electric guitar, acoustic guitar, bouzouki
- Nate Morton – drums, drum programming
- Alexander Sasha Krivtsov – electric bass
- Max Bernstein – electric guitar
- Serban Ghenea – mixing
- Bryce Bordone – mix engineer
- Randy Merrill – mastering

=== Charts ===
Chart performance for "Eyes Open (Taylor's Version)"
Chart (2023)	Peak position
Canada Digital Song Sales (Billboard)	9
New Zealand Hot Singles (RMNZ)	15
UK Singles Downloads (Official Charts)	18
UK Singles Sales (OCC)	18
US Bubbling Under Hot 100 (Billboard)	9
US Digital Song Sales (Billboard)	6
US Hot Country Songs (Billboard)	48
