= Every Moment =

Every Moment may refer to:

- Every Moment (Curt Anderson album), 2016
- Every Moment: The Best of Joy Williams, 2006
