= Songs from This/Songs from That =

Songs From This/Songs From That

Studio album by Joy Williams
- Released: August 17, 2009
- Recorded: 2009
- Genres: Independent, Acoustic
- Length: 38:04 (both albums)
- Label: Sensibility

Joy Williams chronology
One of Those Days (2009)	Songs From This/Songs From That (2009)	More Than I Asked For (2009)

Professional ratings
Review scores
Source	Rating
Jesus Freak Hideout	

Songs From This and Songs From That are a double extended play, from singer/songwriter Joy Williams, that go together to form a single album. They were both released on August 17, 2009. Joy Williams was a member of The Civil Wars before their breakup in 2014, along with John Paul White.

== Promotion ==
"Sunny Day" from Songs From This has been featured on an episode of 90210 and Grey's Anatomy, while "Speaking a Dead Language" from Songs From That has also been featured on the latter show. "Doesn't Get Better Than This" has become the promotional song for Oscar Mayer.

== Track listing ==
All tracks are written by Joy Williams.

Songs From This
No.	Title	Length
1.	"Sunny Day"	2:39
2.	"Fine Line"	3:49
3.	"Golden Thread"	3:33
4.	"I Hate It When We Fight" (feat. David Mead)	3:00
5.	"Turnaround"	3:24
6.	"One Of Those Days"	3:00
Total length:		19:25

Songs From That
No.	Title	Length
1.	"You're My Favorite"	3:20
2.	"The Look of Love" (feat. Tim Myers)	2:18
3.	"Doesn't Get Better Than This"	3:11
4.	"Up Means Down"	2:42
5.	"Speaking a Dead Language"	3:59
6.	"Charmed Life"	3:09
Total length:		18:39
