= Dust to Dust (song) =

Single by The Civil Wars

Single by the Civil Wars

from the album The Civil Wars
- Released: October 7, 2013
- Length: 3:50
- Label: Columbia
- Songwriter(s): Joy Williams, John Paul White
- Producer(s): Charlie Peacock

The Civil Wars singles chronology
"From This Valley" (2013)	"Dust to Dust" (2013)

Music video
- "Dust to Dust" on YouTube

"Dust to Dust" is a song recorded by American folk band the Civil Wars, from their self-titled second studio album in 2013. Written by Joy Williams and John Paul White. The song was released on October 7, 2013 by Columbia Records as the album's third single.

A music video accompanying the single was released on October 3, 2013, the video features footages from their 2011 Paris trip.

== Music video ==
=== Development ===
"When we re-discovered what we'd once thought to be lost footage from two years ago, these forgotten images from a trip to Paris strangely seemed fitting for the feel of "Dust To Dust." For me, it's like stepping back in time. Hope you can also enjoy these simple moments captured in one of the world's most beautiful cities." - Joy Williams

== Release history ==
Country	Date	Format	Label
United States	October 7, 2013	Hot/Modern/AC	Columbia Records

== Chart performance ==
Chart (2013)	Peak position
US Rock Digital Songs (Billboard)	13
US Hot Rock & Alternative Songs (Billboard)	21
