= Every Moment: The Best of Joy Williams =

Greatest hits album by Joy Williams
- Released: September 5, 2006
- Genre: Contemporary Christian music, Christian rock
- Length: 38:10
- Label: Reunion
- Producer: Jason Houser; Kenny Greenberg; Matt Bronleewe; Brown Bannister; Jason McArthur; Dan Muckala

Joy Williams chronology
Genesis (2005)	Every Moment: The Best of Joy Williams (2006)	One of Those Days (EP) (2009)

Professional ratings
Review scores
Source	Rating
Allmusic	3/5 stars
Jesus Freak Hideout	4/5 stars

Every Moment: The Best of Joy Williams is the fourth album by Christian music artist Joy Williams. It includes her greatest hits, including "Hide", her biggest single on Christian radio to date. It also features a new song ("Any More Sure") and her song "Here With Us" from the compilation Christmas album Come Let Us Adore Him. It was released on September 5, 2006.

== Track listing ==
No.	Title	Writer(s)	Original album	Length
1.	"Any More Sure"	Connie Harrington; Kelly Minter; Kenny Greenberg	New song	3:25
2.	"Hide"	Joy Williams; Jason Houser; Matthew West	Genesis	4:12
3.	"We"	Joy Williams; Ian Eskelin	Genesis	2:51
4.	"Every Moment"	Jesse Butterworth; Regie Hamm; Joy Williams	By Surprise	3:14
5.	"By Surprise"	Jesse Butterworth; Joy Williams	By Surprise	3:50
6.	"Serious"	Dan Muckala; Chuck Butler	Joy Williams	3:56
7.	"Surrender"	Rob Graves; Jason McArthur	By Surprise	3:49
8.	"I Believe In You"	Dan Muckala; Ty Lacy	Joy Williams	4:24
9.	"Here With Us"	Ben Glover; Jason Ingram; Joy Williams	Come Let Us Adore Him (A Christmas Worship Experience)	4:55
10.	"Say Goodbye"	Joy Williams; Jason Ingram; Ben Glover	Genesis	3:34
Total length:				38:10

=== Singles ===
- "Any More Sure"

== Notes ==
- The song "By Surprise" is slightly different on this album, than it is on the album By Surprise.
