= Venus (Joy Williams album) =

Studio album by Joy Williams
- Released: June 30, 2015
- Genre: Pop rock
- Length: 39:46
- Label: Sensibility/Columbia
- Producer: Charlie Peacock

Joy Williams chronology
We Mapped the World (2010)	Venus (2015)	Front Porch (2019)

Venus is the fifth studio album by American singer-songwriter Joy Williams. It is her first album since the 2014 breakup of The Civil Wars and her first solo album outside of the contemporary Christian music genre.

== Critical reception ==
Professional ratings
Review scores
Source	Rating
AllMusic	4/5 stars
CCM Magazine	5/5 stars
Paste	7.2/10 stars

At Metacritic, which assigns a "weighted average" rating out of 100 from selected independent ratings and reviews from mainstream critics, the album received a Metascore of 66, based on 8 reviews, indicating "generally favorable reviews". Sarah Rodman of The Boston Globe called the album an "unsparingly intimate, deeply moving 11-song cycle." Timothy Monger of AllMusic writes that the album is "an expansive, decidedly modern record that marries Spartan electronic landscapes with warm acoustic elements." Matt Conner of CCM Magazine also praised the album, awarding it 5 stars out of 5 and calling it "a powerful presentation of a very vulnerable journey inward to rediscover her artistry." In a more mixed review, Haydon Spenceley of Drowned in Sound wrote that Venus is "full of emotive and nuanced performances, the aches of her heart resonating powerfully. However, the sheen and the bombast of much of the production reeks not just of a kind of entitlement, but of desperation."

== Track listing ==
No.	Title	Writer(s)	Length
1.	"Before I Sleep"	Tom Douglas, Paul Moak, Joy Williams	3:34
2.	"Sweet Love of Mine"	Michael Einziger, Moak, Matt Morris, Charlie Peacock, Williams	3:53
3.	"Woman (Oh Mama)"	Audra Mae, Morris, Williams	3:39
4.	"One Day I Will"	Morris, Williams	3:20
5.	"Not Good Enough"	Moak, Williams	4:11
6.	"What A Good Woman Does"	Morris, Williams	3:26
7.	"Until The Levee"	Douglas, Moak, Williams	2:40
8.	"You Loved Me"	Einziger, Morris, Williams	3:13
9.	"The Dying Kind"	Douglas, Moak, Morris, Williams	4:14
10.	"'Til Forever"	Morris, Williams	3:57
11.	"Welcome Home"	Morris, Williams	3:39
Total length:			39:46

== Personnel ==
- Richie Biggs – engineer
- Michael Einziger – classical guitar, producer
- Daniel James – electric guitar, keyboards, producer, vocals
- Ted Jensen – mastering
- Oliver Kraus – strings
- Jerry McPherson – electric guitar
- Paul Moak – acoustic guitar
- Matt Morris – executive producer, multiple instruments, producer, vocals
- Charlie Peacock – engineer, producer
- Mark Stent – mixing

== Charts ==
Chart (2015)	Peak position
US Billboard 200	71
US Americana/Folk Albums (Billboard)	3
