= I'm in Love with You =

I'm in Love with You may refer to:

- I'm in Love with You (album) or the title song, by the Detroit Emeralds, 1973
- "I'm in Love with You" (Joy Williams song), 2005
- "I'm in Love with You" (Tony Moran song), 2018
- "I'm in Love with You" (The 1975 song), 2022
- "I'm In Love With You", a song by Cliff Bennett and the Rebel Rousers, 1961
- "I'm In Love With You", a song by DeBarge from All This Love, 1982
- "I'm In Love With You", a song by Kasenetz-Katz Super Cirkus, 1969
- "I'm In Love With You", a song by Pat Boone, 1956
- "I'm In Love With You", a song by the Rubettes from Baby I Know, 1977
- "I'm In Love With You", a song by Smokie from Solid Ground, 1981
- Humko Tumse Pyaar Hai (lit. 'I'm in Love With You'), a 2006 Indian Hindi-language romance film, starring Ameesha Patel, Bobby Deol and Arjun Rampal
- "Mujhe Tumse Mohabbat Hai" (lit. 'I'm in Love with You'), a song by Nadeem–Shravan, Shaan and Shreya Ghoshal from the 2004 Indian film Tumsa Nahin Dekha
