= Beulah (album) =

Studio album by John Paul White
- Released: August 19, 2016
- Studio: Single Lock Studios (Florence, Alabama); FAME Studios (Muscle Shoals, Alabama)
- Length: 37:55
- Label: Single Lock
- Producer: Ben Tanner; John Paul White

John Paul White chronology
The Long Goodbye (2008)	Beulah (2016)	The Hurting Kind (2019)

Beulah is the second solo studio album by American musician John Paul White. It was released on August 19, 2016, via Single Lock Records. Recording sessions took place at Single Lock Studios in Florence and FAME Studios in Muscle Shoals. Produced by Ben Tanner and John Paul White, it features guest appearances from the Secret Sisters.

The album peaked at number 97 on the Scottish Albums chart and number 136 on the US Billboard 200 albums chart.

== Critical reception ==
Professional ratings
Aggregate scores
Source	Rating
Metacritic	74/100
Review scores
Source	Rating
AllMusic	3.5/5 stars
American Songwriter	3.5/5 stars
The Guardian	3/5 stars
The Independent	4/5 stars
The Standard	3/5 stars

Beulah was met with generally favorable reviews from music critics. At Metacritic, which assigns a normalized rating out of 100 to reviews from mainstream publications, the album received an average score of 74, based on seven reviews.

Andy Gill of The Independent praised the album, stating: "on John Paul White's Beulah, the dark emotions of tracks like "Fight For You" and "Hope I Die" mingle with the bitterness of "The Once And Future Queen" and the low self-esteem of "I'll Get Even" to create a strangely subdued portrait of emotional turmoil, couched in Southern folk and country modes". AllMusic's Thom Jurek wrote: "it's chock-full seductive, attractive melodies and sweet singing, but its lyrics are searing enough in their emotional and spiritual honesty, that they cut to the bone. Great". Jonathan Bernstein of American Songwriter declared: "the record is, in many ways, the very project longtime fans of the Alabama singer-songwriter might have been hoping for for years: a direct collection of sharply-written originals that place White's vulnerable vocals front and center". Alexis Petridis of The Guardian determined: "it's hard not to hope White explores this direction further in future, but for now Beulah will do: mainstream and commercial, but odd and cranky with it, an album that sounds like it wasn't so much written and recorded as got off his chest".

== Track listing ==
All tracks are written by John Paul White.

No.	Title	Length
1.	"Black Leaf"	2:59
2.	"What's So"	4:17
3.	"The Once and Future Queen"	3:53
4.	"Make You Cry"	3:23
5.	"Fight for You"	3:56
6.	"Hope I Die"	3:58
7.	"I've Been Over This Before" (featuring The Secret Sisters)	3:17
8.	"The Martyr"	3:28
9.	"Hate the Way You Love Me"	4:04
10.	"I'll Get Even"	4:40
Total length:		37:55

== Personnel ==
- John Paul White – lyrics, vocals, acoustic guitar (tracks: 1–5, 7–10), electric guitars (tracks: 1, 6, 8), baritone guitar (tracks: 3, 4, 7, 10), producer, package design
- Laura Rogers – vocals (tracks: 2–4, 7–9)
- Lydia Slagle – vocals (tracks: 2–4, 7–9)
- Jon Estes – piano (tracks: 1, 4), bass (tracks: 3–5, 7, 9, 10), mandolin (track 9)
- Jason Goforth – lap steel (tracks: 1, 3, 4, 6), harmonica (tracks: 2, 5)
- Ben Tanner – pump organ (tracks: 1, 4, 9), electric guitar (tracks: 2, 6), B3 (tracks: 2, 5, 8), Wurlitzer (track 3), producer, recording, mixing
- David Hood – bass (track 1)
- Ken Lewis – percussion
- Jonathan Oliphant – vibraphone (tracks: 1, 4, 7, 10), package design
- Bryan Farris – electric guitar (tracks: 2, 5)
- Zac Cockrell – bass (tracks: 2, 6, 8)
- Jeremy Gibson – drums (tracks: 2, 5, 6)
- Kimi Samson – violin (tracks: 4, 6, 10)
- Caleb Elliott – cello (tracks: 4, 6, 10)
- Elizabeth Estes – fiddle (tracks: 7, 9)
- Reed Watson – drums (track 8)
- Richard Dodd – mastering
- Browan Lollar – artwork
- Rachel Briggs – package design

== Charts ==
Chart (2016)	Peak position
Scottish Albums (OCC)	97
UK Americana Albums (OCC)	5
UK Independent Albums (OCC)	26
US Billboard 200	136
US Top Album Sales (Billboard)	40
US Top Rock Albums (Billboard)	13
US Folk Albums (Billboard)	4
US Top Current Album Sales (Billboard)	34
US Independent Albums (Billboard)	9
US Vinyl Albums (Billboard)	6
