= Genesis (Joy Williams album) =

Studio album by Joy Williams
- Released: May 3, 2005
- Genre: Contemporary Christian music, Pop, pop rock
- Length: 40:36
- Label: Reunion
- Producer: Matt Bronleewe

Joy Williams chronology
By Surprise (2002)	Genesis (2005)	Every Moment: The Best of Joy Williams (2006)

Professional ratings
Review scores
Source	Rating
AllMusic	4.5/5 stars
Jesus Freak Hideout	4.5/5 stars

Genesis is the third album from Christian pop artist Joy Williams, with singles "Hide", "We" and "Say Goodbye", released in 2005.

== Track listing ==
No.	Title	Writer(s)	Length
1.	"Stay"	Joy Williams; Jason Ingram; Ben Glover	3:14
2.	"We"	Joy Williams; Ian Eskelin	2:48
3.	"Say Goodbye"	Joy Williams; Jason Ingram; Ben Glover	3:34
4.	"Hide"	Joy Williams; Jason Houser; Matthew West	4:09
5.	"Beautiful Redemption"	Joy Williams; Jason Ingram; Ben Glover	5:28
6.	"Unafraid"	Joy Williams; Jason Ingram; David May	3:35
7.	"Silence"	Joy Williams; Jason Ingram; Jason Houser	5:04
8.	"I'm In Love With You"	Joy Williams; Brandon Heath	4:06
9.	"God Only Knows"	Joy Williams; Jason Ingram; Matt Bronleewe	3:36
10.	"Child of Eden"	Joy Williams; Jason Ingram; Jason Houser	5:02
Total length:			40:36

iTunes Bonus Track
No.	Title	Writer(s)	Length
11.	"I'm In Love With You (Demo)"	Joy Williams; Brandon Heath	3:45

=== Singles ===
- "Hide"
- "We"
- "Say Goodbye"
- "God Only Knows"

== Personnel ==
- Joy Williams – all vocals
- Jeremy Bose – programming
- Stephen Leiweke – guitars
- Matt Bronleewe – additional guitars
- James Gregory – bass
- Joe Porter – drums
- Keith Getty – string arrangements
- Joni McCabe – string conductor
- The City of Prague Philharmonic Orchestra – strings

== Production ==
- Robert Beeson – executive producer
- Michael Blanton – executive producer
- Jason McArthur – executive producer
- Matt Bronleewe – producer
- Aaron Swihart – recording
- Michael Morena – recording assistant
- Milan Jílek – string recording
- Chris Henning – digital editing
- F. Reid Shippen – mixing
- Lee Bridges – mix assistant
- Greg Calbi – mastering
- Michelle Pearson – A&R production
- Alice Smith – production coordinator
- Stephanie McBrayer – art direction
- Tim Parker – design
- Andrew Southam – photography
- Maude – stylist
- Sabrina Paul – hair, make-up
- Joy Williams – liner notes
- Blanton, Harrell, Cooke & Corzine – management

Studios

- Recorded at Platinum Lab and Pentavarit (Nashville, Tennessee).
- Strings recorded at Studio A of The Czech Television.
- Mastered at Sterling Sound (New York City, New York).

== Chart performance ==
- #18 Top Christian Albums
- #17 Top Heatseekers
- #26 Top Independent Albums

== Awards ==
In 2006, the album was nominated for a Dove Award for Pop/Contemporary Album of the Year at the 37th GMA Dove Awards. The song "Hide" was also nominated for Pop/Contemporary Recorded Song of the Year.
