= I'm in Love with You (Joy Williams song) =

"I'm in Love with You" is a 2005 song by Joy Williams off her third album, Genesis.

Joy said that the song is dedicated to her husband stating in a Christian interview:

"I'm in Love with You" is a love song to my best friend and the man that I have committed my life to. Nate and I were married in June of last year (2004). Every single line from this song is a memory for me, and each line has been taken from my journal. Nate didn't have any idea I was writing this song. I never told him until the day I decided to let him hear it. I remember saying to Nate, “Hey, I have a demo I want you to hear!” He had just gotten back from a long day at work, and he plopped down on the couch. I said, “I wrote this for you.” Nate just started listening to this and by the first chorus he had alligator tears streaming down his face."

The song has been well received by fans and is one of her most listened to tracks on her MySpace.

It has also been speculated to be her next single, but this has yet to be confirmed.

== Notes ==
- The song has been frequently popularised through YouTube fan videos.
