= Hide (Joy Williams song) =

Single by Joy Williams

from the album Genesis
- Released: 2005
- Genre: Contemporary Christian Music
- Label: Reunion Records
- Songwriter(s): Joy Williams, Jason Houser, Matthew West
- Producer(s): Matt Bronleewe

"Hide" is the smash lead single from Joy Williams' third album Genesis. It is available digitally on the internet. This song also appears on the WOW Hits 2006 compilation album.

== Track listing ==
1. "Hide" (CHR Mix)

== Chart performance ==
- No. 1 AC (6 wks)
- No. 1 CHR (4 wks)
- No. 10 INSPO

== Awards ==
In 2006, the song was nominated for a Dove Award for Pop/Contemporary Song of the Year at the 37th GMA Dove Awards.
