= We Mapped the World =

EP by Joy Williams
- Released: April 5, 2010
- Recorded: 2010
- Genre: Indie, acoustic, alternative
- Length: 12:55
- Label: Sensibility

Joy Williams chronology
More Than I Asked For (2009)	We Mapped the World (2010)	Venus (2015)

We Mapped the World is an extended play by musician, Joy Williams. It was released on April 5, 2010.

== Track listing ==
All tracks are written by Joy Williams.

No.	Title	Length
1.	"We Mapped the World"	2:55
2.	"Tightrope"	3:04
3.	"Woman of a City"	3:36
4.	"Lover, Find Your Cover"	3:20
Total length:		12:55
