= Barton Hollow (song) =

2011 single by The Civil Wars

Single by the Civil Wars

from the album Barton Hollow
- B-side: "You Are My Sunshine"
- Released: January 10, 2011
- Genre: Bluegrass; folk rock; alternative country; indie folk
- Length: 3:20
- Label: sensibility
- Songwriter(s): John Paul White; Joy Williams
- Producer(s): Charlie Peacock

The Civil Wars singles chronology
"Poison & Wine" (2009)	"Barton Hollow" (2011)	"Dance Me to the End of Love" (2011)

"Barton Hollow" is a country and indie folk song co-written and recorded by the Civil Wars. It was released on January 10, 2011 as the second single and title-track to their debut album Barton Hollow. The single did not enter the U.S. Hot 100 but charted on the top spot of the Bubbling Under Hot 100 Singles. The single's vinyl release had "You Are My Sunshine" as its B-side.

The song won the Best Country Duo/Group Performance Award at the 54th Grammy Awards in 2012.

== Song information ==
"Barton Hollow" was available for download on January 10, 2011 and was also released on limited edition 7-inch vinyl. The song's music video was taken in a shoot in a rural location called Mt. Zion, near Minor Hill, Tennessee. As regards the song's title, it refers to the community of Barton, Alabama, a few miles from White's hometown of Muscle Shoals.

"You Are My Sunshine", the B-side, is one of the two official songs of the State of Louisiana. It was written by former Louisiana state governor Jimmie Davis and Charles Mitchell.

The song charted at No. 1 on the Bubbling Under Hot 100 Singles in the United States.

== Critical reception ==
The track received positive reviews. Phil Mongredien of The Guardian commented that "the mood of reverie [in the album] is only broken by the raucous, insistent title track." Louis Corner of Digital Spy wrote that the song was "charged with a Deep South strum line", and "[managed] to encompass alternative rock-influences that makes it accessible to any countryphobe."

The song won the Best Country Duo/Group Performance Award at the 54th Grammy Awards in 2012, despite not having been sent to country radio. Other nominees in the category include Kelly Clarkson and Jason Aldean, Kenny Chesney featuring Grace Potter, and Thompson Square.

== Track listing ==
US 7-inch vinyl

1. "Barton Hollow" [single version] – 3:20
2. "You Are My Sunshine" – 3:09

== Chart performance ==
Chart (2011)	Peak position
US Bubbling Under Hot 100 Singles	1
