= One of Those Days (EP) =

EP by Joy Williams
- Released: January 27, 2009
- Recorded: 2008
- Genre: Independent, acoustic
- Length: 12:42
- Label: Sensibility

Joy Williams chronology
Every Moment: The Best of Joy Williams (2006)	One of Those Days (2009)	Songs From This/Songs From That (2009)

Professional ratings
Review scores
Source	Rating
Jesus Freak Hideout	

One of Those Days is the first independent extended play from former Christian pop artist Joy Williams.

== Promotion ==
"Charmed Life" was featured on the season 5 finale of ABC's Grey's Anatomy, while "One of Those Days" was heard on an episode of Lifetime's Drop Dead Diva.

== Track listing ==
No.	Title	Length
1.	"One of Those Days"	3:01
2.	"What Can I Do (But Love You)"	3:08
3.	"Charmed Life"	3:10
4.	"I'm Gonna Break Your Heart"	3:23
Total length:		12:42

Pre-order bonus tracks
No.	Title	Length
5.	"What Can I Do (But Love You)" (Live version)
6.	"Charmed Life" (Live version)
7.	"I'm Gonna Break Your Heart" (Alternate version)

ReverbNation Free Download
No.	Title	Length
8.	"Lose Myself"

=== Singles ===
- "One of Those Days" was released as a single in early 2009. It peaked at #25 on Christian pop radio. The music video for the song premiered on April 2.
- "Charmed Life" was released as a digital remixes EP on May 28, 2009 to promote the song". An acoustic music video premiered on May 14, 2009.
1. "Charmed Life" (Olaj Remix)
2. "Charmed Life" (Bronleewe & Bose Remix)
3. "I'm Gonna Break Your Heart" (Lark Remix)
