= Front Porch =

Studio album by Joy Williams
- Released: May 3, 2019
- Length: 43:13
- Label: Sensibility/The Orchard
- Producer: Kenneth Pattengale

Joy Williams chronology
Venus (2016)	Front Porch (2019)

Professional ratings
Aggregate scores
Source	Rating
Metacritic	72/100
Review scores
Source	Rating
AllMusic	3.5/5 stars
PopMatters	8/10

Front Porch is the sixth studio album by American singer-songwriter Joy Williams. It was released on May 3, 2019 by Sensibility Recordings. It was nominated for Best Folk Album at the 62nd Grammy Awards.

== Critical reception ==
On AllMusic, Stephen Thomas Erlewine said, "Working with producer Kenneth Pattengale, who is best known as part of the Milk Carton Kids, Williams strips away any contemporary affectations, keeping the focus directly on the songs and her plaintive, powerful voice."

On PopMatters, Chris Conaton wrote, "And it's hard to deny that Front Porch is Williams at her best. It took some time for her to come to terms with it, but this is an album that embraces Williams' legacy from the Civil Wars and incorporates it into her own musical personality."

On NPR, Jewly Hight said, "She's framed Front Porch as her return home – to a stripped-down, acoustic palette... to Nashville, the Southern, music-making city where she's spent most of her professional life following a coastal California youth... For Williams, there's a balance to be struck between theatrical and intimate expression, and embracing warmth and simplicity as an approach... doesn't require abandoning poise and polish."

== Track listing ==
No.	Title	Writer(s)	Length
1.	"Canary"	Joy Williams, Angelo Petraglia, Caitlyn Smith	3:28
2.	"Front Porch"	Williams, Liz Rose, Emily Shackleton	3:51
3.	"When Does a Heart Move On"	Williams, Cason Cooley, Trent Dabbs	3:52
4.	"All I Need"	Williams, Thad Cockrell, Paul Moak, Matt Morris	3:53
5.	"The Trouble with Wanting"	Williams, Natalie Hemby	3:55
6.	"No Place Like You"	Williams, Moak, Smith	2:55
7.	"One and Only"	Williams, Cockrell	3:08
8.	"When Creation Was Young"	Williams, Hemby, Jon Randall	3.29
9.	"Preacher's Daughter"	Williams, Hemby, Rose	4:36
10.	"Hotel St. Cecilia"	Williams, Rose, Shackleton	3:30
11.	"Be with You"	Williams, Cockrell	4:37
12.	"Look How Far We've Come"	Williams, Hemby	1:56
Total length:			43:13

== Personnel ==
Credits adapted from AllMusic

- Emily Algar – A&R
- Andy Barron – photography
- Richie Biggs – mixing
- Caitlin Canty – backing vocals
- Anthony da Costa – guitar, backing vocals
- Brett Davis – studio assistant
- Richard Dodd – mastering
- Michelle Freetly – studio assistant
- John Mailander – mandolin, violin
- Scott Mulvahill – bass
- Russ Pahl – pedal steel guitar
- Kenneth Pattengale – dobro, guitar, mandolin, backing vocals, producer
- Dustin Richardson – assistant engineer
- Matt Ross–Sprang – engineer
- Joy Williams – lead vocals, backing vocals
- Nate Yetton – A&R, executive producer

== Charts ==
Chart (2019)	Peak position
UK Americana Albums (OCC)	8
UK Independent Albums (OCC)	45
US Americana/Folk Albums (Billboard)	10
US Independent Albums (Billboard)	9
US Top Album Sales (Billboard)	32
