= Curt Anderson (musician) =

- Born: Curtis William Anderson; June 6, 1984 (age 42); Iowa City, Iowa, U.S.
- Origin: Ithaca, Michigan, U.S.
- Genres: Christian pop, worship
- Occupations: Singer, songwriter, worship leader
- Instruments: vocals, piano, guitar
- Years active: 2013–present
- Labels: Dream, 2014-2016; Independent, 2016–present
- Website: curtandersonmedia.com

Curtis William "Curt" Anderson (born June 6, 1984) is an American Christian musician and worship leader who primarily performs Christian pop and contemporary worship music. He released his debut studio album, Every Moment, in 2016 through Dream Records.

== Early and personal life ==
Anderson was born Curtis William Anderson on June 6, 1984, in Iowa City, Iowa. He is the son of William and Robyn Anderson (née Olsen). His family soon moved to Pittsburgh, Pennsylvania, where they are originally from, though he spent most of his formative years in Ithaca, Michigan, graduating from Ithaca High School. He attended Anderson University in Anderson, Indiana, where he studied music business. He moved to Nashville, Tennessee, to pursue his music career in 2009. Anderson is married to Brittney Anderson, and they have two children together.

== Music career ==
He began recording music in 2002 while in high school, selling a one-take homemade CD to classmates. Soon after, he started performing under the name No Greater Sky and released an album titled Hearts & Stars in 2006. Anderson said he wanted people to connect more easily, so he dropped the No Greater Sky name and began using his own name as a solo artist. He signed a licensing deal with Dream Records in 2015 and released his first international studio album, Every Moment, on January 15, 2016. His songs "Keep it Beating" and "Every Moment" were released as singles to Christian and mixed-format radio internationally. Both songs were among the highest played songs of 2016 in Australia and other countries. Anderson's music can also be heard on in-store radio in over 32,000 retail stores, including Walgreens and Kroger brands.

Anderson told Hallels his inspiration for the music on the album is that people hear about the love Jesus Christ has for them. In an interview with Michigan newspaper The Morning Sun, Anderson said, "I love people and I think music is the vehicle God gave me to be able to love people and impact them in some way."

In April 2018, Anderson released Every Moment Vol. II, which includes the singles "Keep Me Falling" and "Love Like You Love". Both singles saw significant airplay on Christian radio internationally, earning the No. 14 and No. 76 spots on the TCM Top 100 songs of 2018 in Australia. Each of his singles has spent over 25 weeks in the TCM Top 30 in Australia.

He has written songs for other artists, including KJ-52, Tricia Brock of Superchick, and Satellites & Sirens.

He has toured in nearly 60 countries and performed at the US Capitol.

== Discography ==
Studio albums

- Every Moment (January 15, 2016, Dream)
- Every Moment Vol. II (April 2, 2018, Independent)
