= More Than I Asked For =

More Than I Asked For: Celebrating Christmas with Joy Williams

EP by Joy Williams
- Released: November 23, 2009
- Recorded: 2009
- Genre: Holiday
- Length: 11:39
- Label: Sensibility

Joy Williams chronology
Songs From This/Songs From That (2009)	More Than I Asked For: Celebrating Christmas with Joy Williams (2009)	We Mapped the World (2010)

More Than I Asked For: Celebrating Christmas with Joy Williams is the first holiday-themed release from musician Joy Williams. It was released on November 23, 2009.

== Track listing ==
1. "More Than I Asked For"
2. "A Little Bit of Love"
3. "A Little Bit of Love (GarageBand)" (NoiseTrade Exclusive)
4. "Bring a Torch, Jeannette, Isabella" (NoiseTrade Exclusive)
