= Every Moment (Curt Anderson album) =

Studio album by Curt Anderson
- Released: January 15, 2016
- Genre: Worship, Christian pop
- Length: 44:25
- Label: Dream

Every Moment is the first studio album from Curt Anderson. Dream Records released the album on January 15, 2016.

== Critical reception ==
Professional ratings
Review scores
Source	Rating
365 Days of Inspiring Media	4/5 stars
CCM Magazine	4/5 stars
Jesus Freak Hideout	2.5/5 stars 3/5 stars

Awarding the album four stars from CCM Magazine, Andy Argyrakis describes, "vibrant canvas." Joshua Andre, allotting the album a four star review at 365 Days of Inspiring Media, states, "a memorable debut album". Sarah Berdon, allocating the album a two and a half star rating for Jesus Freak Hideout, writes, "Mediocrity". Giving the album a three star review from Jesus Freak Hideout, Christopher Smith says, "Every Moment is worth checking out".

== Track listing ==
No.	Title	Writer(s)	Length
1.	"Keep It Beating"	Josh Bronleewe, Curt Anderson, & Pete Stewart	3:41
2.	"Love Is Rising"	Josh Bronleewe, Matt Bronleewe, & Curt Anderson	3:44
3.	"Love Like You Love"	Pete Kipley & Curt Anderson	3:18
4.	"When It Hurts"	Jeff Pardo & Curt Anderson	3:16
5.	"Lights"	Nick Baumhardt & Curt Anderson	3:53
6.	"Every Moment"	Ethan Hulse, Keith Everette Smith, & Curt Anderson	3:25
7.	"Live for More"	Andrew Fromm, Curt Anderson, & Paul Moak	3:42
8.	"I Won't Run"	Jeremy Fowler & Curt Anderson	4:07
9.	"All of Me" (featuring KJ-52)	Jonah Jorrentino, Curt Anderson, & Peye Stewart	3:42
10.	"For Us"	Bryan Brown, Curt Anderson, & Jeff Pardo	3:05
11.	"Beautiful Life"	Robin Ghosh & Curt Anderson	3:21
12.	"Holy"	Kevin Bruchert & Curt Anderson	5:04
Total length:			44:25
