= Nathan Chapman =

Nathan Chapman may refer to:

- Nathan Chapman (soldier), first American killed in the Invasion of Afghanistan
- Nathan Chapman (footballer), Australian rules footballer
- Nathan Chapman (record producer), country music record producer and session musician
