= Joy Ann Williams =

American immunologist (1961–2016)

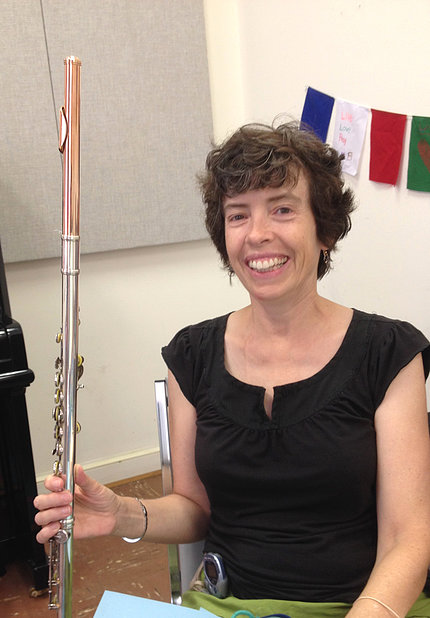
- Williams in 2014
- Born: June 13, 1961; Arlington County, Virginia, U.S.
- Died: November 18, 2016 (aged 55)
- Education: Oberlin College; Oberlin Conservatory of Music; University of Maryland, College Park
- Occupation: Immunologist
- Scientific career
- Fields: Immunology
- Workplaces: National Cancer Institute

Joy Ann Williams (June 13, 1961 – November 18, 2016) was an American immunologist at the National Cancer Institute where she researched the biology of thymic development.

== Early life and education ==
Williams was born on June 13, 1961 in Arlington County, Virginia, and raised in Arlington and Alexandria, Virginia. She graduated from T.C. Williams' High School.

Williams completed bachelor's degrees in biology and piano performance from Oberlin College and Oberlin Conservatory of Music. She earned a master's degree in molecular biology and a Ph.D. in immunology from the University of Maryland, College Park. Her dissertation was titled Regulation of macrophage cytokine production by prostaglandin E₂: distinct roles of cyclooxygenase-1 and -2.

As a graduate student, she worked at the National Cancer Institute (NCI) as a pre-doctoral Intramural Research Training Award fellow in the Laboratory of Genetics under Dr. Michael Potter. She then worked as a biologist under her graduate mentor, Emily Shacter, first in the Laboratory of Genetics, and later in the Center for Biologics Evaluation and Research. The year after earning her Ph.D., Williams joined the laboratory of Richard Hodes in NCI's Experimental Immunology Branch as a postdoctoral fellow.

== Career ==
Williams worked as a regulatory/research scientist at the Food and Drug Administration. In 2006, Williams’ interest in basic research brought her back to Hodes’ lab at National Institutes of Health (NIH) as a staff scientist. In latest work, Williams advanced the understanding of the biology of thymic development and the cross-talk between thymic epithelium and the developing T-cell repertoire.

In her years at NIH, Williams taught courses through the Federation of American Societies for Experimental Biology and at the University of Maryland University College.

== Personal life and death ==
Williams performed on piano, flute and accordion. After a 2010 piano concert at the National Institutes of Health Clinical Center, she was quoted in The Scientist: “Playing the piano focuses me” and “absorbs my mind in different ways than science.” Williams remained active in a variety of music activities, including teaching, accompanying other musicians and performing. Williams rode her bicycle to work on the Capital Crescent Trail.

Williams died from ovarian cancer on November 18, 2016, after a four-year battle with the disease. She was 55. Williams was survived by her husband, Todd R. Smyth, her parents Harrison Brownell Williams and Ann Peterson Williams, her sister Julie Arrighetti, her brother-in-law Craig Arrighetti and her nephew Nicholas Arrighetti.
