= Live at Eddie's Attic =

Live album by the Civil Wars
- Released: June 30, 2009
- Venue: Eddie's Attic
- Length: 37:35
- Label: Sensibility

The Civil Wars chronology
Live at Eddie's Attic (2009)	Poison & Wine (2009)

Live at Eddie's Attic is the first release from The Civil Wars, featuring Joy Williams and John Paul White. The album was recorded live at Eddie's Attic in Decatur, Georgia on April 8, 2009. It was released on their website through NoiseTrade as a free download on June 30, 2009. The album has been downloaded over 500,000 times to date. On April 19, 2014, the album was re-released in a limited edition vinyl pressing in celebration of Record Store Day.

== Track listing ==
All tracks are written by Joy Williams and John Paul White, unless otherwise noted

No.	Title	Writer(s)	Length
1.	"If I Didn't Know Better"		3:29
2.	"20 Years"		3:19
3.	"Falling"		4:06
4.	"Poison & Wine"	Chris Lindsey	4:02
5.	"Tip of My Tongue"		3:19
6.	"My Father's Father"		3:39
7.	"No Ordinary Love"	Sade Adu, Stuart Matthewman	4:26
8.	"Girl With The Red Balloon"		3:57
9.	"Dance Me to The End of Love"	Leonard Cohen	3:19
10.	"Falling" ((demo) [bonus track])		3:59
Total length:			37:35
