= Barton Hollow =

Studio album by the Civil Wars
- Released: February 1, 2011
- Recorded: The Art House, Nashville, Tennessee
- Genres: Folk rock, alternative country, indie folk
- Length: 46:27
- Label: sensibility
- Producer: Charlie Peacock

The Civil Wars chronology
Poison & Wine (2009)	Barton Hollow (2011)	The Civil Wars (2013)

Singles from Barton Hollow
- 1. "Barton Hollow" Released: January 10, 2011

Barton Hollow is the first full-length studio album from the Civil Wars. Produced by Charlie Peacock, it was released on February 1, 2011. It peaked at No. 1 on the Billboard Digital Albums chart, No. 10 on the Billboard 200, No. 1 on the Billboard Folk Albums chart, and No. 2 on the Billboard Rock Albums chart, selling 25,000 copies in its first week. As of August 2013, the album has sold 623,000 copies in the US.

Barton Hollow was preceded by the lead single and title track, which was performed live on The Tonight Show with Jay Leno on January 14, 2011. A track on this album, "Poison and Wine" was previously released as a single from their EP Poison & Wine in 2009. On November 30, 2011, Barton Hollow was nominated for Grammys in the Best Folk Album and Best Country Duo/Group Performance categories, for the title song. The album ended up winning both awards. Numerous publications noted that the Civil Wars were snubbed a Best New Artist nomination by The Grammys. At the ceremony the Civil Wars performed a portion of "Barton Hollow". The vinyl LP version of the record was pressed at United Record Pressing in Nashville, TN.

== Critical reception ==
Professional ratings
Review scores
Source	Rating
AllMusic	4/5 stars
MusicOMH	4/5 stars

Barton Hollow was included on the 2011 Best Album lists of NPR Music, Paste Magazine, American Songwriter, Rough Trade, Amazon.com, Time, iTunes, The Huffington Post, Associated Press, The Tennessean, AllMusic.com and more.

Andrew Leahey of AllMusic said that Williams and White "trace each other's melodies with close harmonies that never fail to lose their romance". He gave Barton Hollow four of five stars and called it "Good stuff". Darren Lee of MusicOMH also gave four of five stars, saying "The album's songs of love, loss and longing are an immediate pleasure to listen to, displaying real restraint in a disc that is pleasingly sparse and unembellished."

In 2017 it was ranked No. 66 in Paste magazine's "The 100 Best Indie Folk Albums" list.

== Track listing ==
All songs were written by Joy Williams and John Paul White, except where noted. The two bonus tracks are available with electronic album's versions. but not on the CD. An extended version of Barton Hollow was released in Europe through Sony Music on March 1, 2012, which contained the 12 tracks included with the North American release, the 2 bonus tracks from the electronic version, plus 4 additional tracks.

No.	Title	Writer(s)	Length
1.	"20 Years"		3:02
2.	"I've Got This Friend"		3:24
3.	"C'est la mort"		2:30
4.	"To Whom It May Concern"		3:32
5.	"Poison & Wine"	Williams, White, Chris Lindsey	3:40
6.	"My Father's Father"		3:21
7.	"Barton Hollow"		3:26
8.	"The Violet Hour"		3:26
9.	"Girl With the Red Balloon"		3:50
10.	"Falling"		3:59
11.	"Forget Me Not"		2:57
12.	"Birds of a Feather"		3:06

Electronic version bonus tracks
No.	Title	Writer(s)	Length
13.	"I Want You Back"	Berry Gordy, Freddie Perren, Alphonzo Mizell and Deke Richards	3:15
14.	"Dance Me to the End of Love"	Leonard Cohen	3:05

European edition bonus tracks
No.	Title	Writer(s)	Length
13.	"Billie Jean"	Michael Jackson	4:09
14.	"I Want You Back"	Berry Gordy, Freddie Perren, Alphonzo Mizell and Deke Richards	3:15
15.	"Dance Me to the End of Love"	Leonard Cohen	3:05
16.	"You Are My Sunshine"	Jimmie Davis and Charles Mitchell	3:09
17.	"Goodbye Girl"	John Paul White; Joy Williams	4:00
18.	"Marionette" (demo)	John Paul White; Joy Williams	3:01

== Personnel ==
Listed in AllMusic.

- Joy Williams: lead vocals, background vocals, piano, Hohner organ, bells
- John Paul White: lead vocals, background vocals, acoustic guitar, electric guitar, resonator guitar, banjo, bass guitar
- Andy Leftwich: fiddle, mandolin
- David Davidson: violin
- John Catchings: cello
- Jerry McPherson: electric guitar
- J.T. Corenflos: electric guitar
- Dan Dugmore: pedal steel guitar
- Tim Lauer: keyboards, synthesizer, keyboard bass, organ, "tiny keyboard"
- Charlie Peacock: electric piano, trumpet, producer, additional engineering
- Barry Bales: double bass
- Ken Lewis: percussion
- Richie Biggs: engineer, mixer
- Richard Dodd: mastering

== Charts ==
=== Weekly charts ===
Weekly sales chart performance for Barton Hollow
Chart (2011–2012)	Peak position
Belgian Albums (Ultratop Flanders)	37
Canadian Albums (Billboard)	16
Dutch Albums (Album Top 100)	93
Irish Albums (IRMA)	26
New Zealand Albums (RMNZ)	40
Scottish Albums (Official Charts)	13
UK Albums (Official Charts)	13
US Billboard 200	10
US Americana/Folk Albums (Billboard)	1
US Independent Albums (Billboard)	1
US Top Rock Albums (Billboard)	2

=== Year-end charts ===
Year-end chart performance for Barton Hollow
Chart (2011)	Position
US Billboard 200	153
US Top Rock Albums (Billboard)	29
Chart (2012)	Position
US Billboard 200	88
US Top Rock Albums (Billboard)	27

=== Singles ===
Sales chart performance for singles from Barton Hollow
Year	Single	Peak positions
Year	Single	US
2011	"Barton Hollow"^{A}	101

- ^{A} Did not enter the Hot 100 but charted on Bubbling Under Hot 100 Singles.

== Certifications ==
Sales certifications for Barton Hollow
Region	Certification	Certified units/sales
Canada (Music Canada)	Gold	40,000^{^}
United Kingdom (BPI)	Gold	100,000^{*}
United States (RIAA)	Gold	623,000
^{*} Sales figures based on certification alone.^{^} Shipments figures based on certification alone.
