= The Civil Wars (album) =

Studio album by the Civil Wars
- Released: August 6, 2013
- Studio: Nashville
- Length: 42:58
- Language: English (Apart from "Sacred Heart" which is in French)
- Label: Columbia/sensibility
- Producer: Charlie Peacock, Rick Rubin

The Civil Wars chronology
Barton Hollow (2011)	The Civil Wars (2013)

Singles from The Civil Wars
- 1. "The One That Got Away" Released: June 11, 2013; 2. "From This Valley" Released: June 25, 2013; 3. "Dust to Dust" Released: October 7, 2013

The Civil Wars is the second and final album by American alternative folk band the Civil Wars. The album was released on August 6, 2013, by Sensibility Music/Columbia Records.

The Civil Wars received generally positive reviews from music critics, and it sold more than 116,000 copies, making it debut at No. 1 on the Billboard 200. The song "From This Valley" won them their fourth Grammy, the second one in the category Best Country Duo/Group Performance.

== Promotion ==
"The One That Got Away" and "From This Valley" were released as singles in June 2013. The third single from the album, "Dust to Dust", was released to Hot adult contemporary radio in the United States on October 7, 2013.

== Reception ==
=== Critical reception ===
Professional ratings
Aggregate scores
Source	Rating
Metacritic	71/100
Review scores
Source	Rating
AbsolutePunk	95%
AllMusic	3.5/5 stars
The A.V. Club	B+
Billboard	91/100
Consequence of Sound	4/5 stars
Slant Magazine	4/5 stars

The Civil Wars received positive reviews from critics. According to Metacritic, the album has scored 71 out of 100 based on 29 reviews, indicating generally favorable reviews, the same score Barton Hollow, the duo's previous album, received.

=== Commercial performance ===
The album debuted at No. 1 on the Billboard 200 chart with sales of 116,000 copies.

== Track listing ==
All tracks are written by Joy Williams and John Paul White, unless otherwise noted.

No.	Title	Writer(s)	Length
1.	"The One That Got Away"	Joy Williams, John Paul White, Charlie Peacock	3:30
2.	"I Had Me a Girl"		3:45
3.	"Same Old Same Old"		3:48
4.	"Dust to Dust"		3:49
5.	"Eavesdrop"	Williams, White, Peacock	3:35
6.	"Devil's Backbone"	Williams, White, Peacock	2:29
7.	"From This Valley"	Williams, White, Phil Madeira	3:33
8.	"Tell Mama"	Clarence Carter, Marcus Daniel, Wilbur Terrell	3:48
9.	"Oh Henry"		3:32
10.	"Disarm"	Billy Corgan	4:42
11.	"Sacred Heart"		3:19
12.	"D'Arline"		3:08
Total length:			42:58

== Personnel ==
The Civil Wars

- Joy Williams – vocals
- John Paul White – electric guitar, acoustic guitar, vocals

Technical personnel

- Charlie Peacock – production, engineering, arrangements
- Rick Rubin – production ("I Had Me a Girl")
- Tom Elmhirst – mixing
- Ben Baptie – Pro Tools, mixing assistant
- Joe Visciano – mixing assistant

Additional musicians

- Charlie Peacock – piano, Fender Rhodes, keyboards, bass, keyboard bass, drums, LinnDrum
- Sam Ashworth– tambourine, tom-tom, engineer
- Barry Bales – double bass
- Jerry Douglas – Dobro
- Dan Dugmore – lap steel guitar, pedal steel guitar
- Mark Hill – bass
- Andy Leftwitch – fiddle, mandolin
- Jerry McPherson – electric guitar
- Gabe Scott – hammer dulcimer
- Aaron Sterling – cymbals, drums, bass drum
- Jeff Taylor – accordion, harmonium, pump organ, piano

== Charts ==
=== Weekly charts ===
Chart (2013)	Peak position
Australian Albums (ARIA)	35
Belgian Albums (Ultratop Flanders)	46
Canadian Albums (Billboard)	1
Dutch Albums (Album Top 100)	72
German Albums (Offizielle Top 100)	93
Irish Albums (IRMA)	3
New Zealand Albums (RMNZ)	16
Norwegian Albums (VG-lista)	34
Scottish Albums (OCC)	2
Swiss Albums (Schweizer Hitparade)	37
UK Albums (OCC)	2
US Billboard 200	1
US Americana/Folk Albums (Billboard)	1
US Top Rock Albums (Billboard)	1
US Indie Store Album Sales (Billboard)	1

=== Year-end charts ===
Chart (2013)	Position
US Billboard 200	105
US Top Rock Albums (Billboard)	26

== Certifications ==
Region	Certification	Certified units/sales
United States (RIAA)	Gold	500,000^{‡}
^{‡} Sales+streaming figures based on certification alone.
