= By Surprise (album) =

Studio album by Joy Williams
- Released: October 8, 2002
- Genre: Contemporary Christian music, Pop rock, pop
- Length: 38:54
- Label: Reunion
- Producer: Brown Bannister

Joy Williams chronology
Joy Williams (2001)	By Surprise (2002)	Genesis (2005)

Professional ratings
Review scores
Source	Rating
AllMusic	2/5 stars
Jesus Freak Hideout	4/5 stars

By Surprise is the second album by Christian pop/rock artist Joy Williams. It features the songs "Every Moment", "Surrender", "I Wonder" and the title track.

== Track listing ==
No.	Title	Writer(s)	Length
1.	"New Day"	Rob Graves; Jason McArthur	4:09
2.	"I Wonder"	Rob Graves; Jason McArthur	3:46
3.	"Every Moment"	Jesse Butterworth; Regie Hamm; Joy Williams	3:12
4.	"By Surprise"	Jesse Butterworth; Joy Williams	3:49
5.	"Surrender"	Rob Graves; Jason McArthur	3:47
6.	"Desperate"	David Mullen; Joy Williams	4:12
7.	"Every Day"	Jesse Butterworth; Joy Williams; Amy Roth	3:01
8.	"Wish"	Rob Graves; Jason McArthur; Joy Williams	3:55
9.	"Beautiful Somehow"	Rob Graves; Joy Williams	4:45
10.	"The Love of the Lord Endures"	Jesse Butterworth; Amy Roth	4:18
Total length:			38:54

== Personnel ==
- Joy Williams – lead vocals, backing vocals (1, 3, 5–9)
- Jamie Kenney – keyboards (1, 2, 4, 6, 7, 9)
- Blair Masters – acoustic piano (3), Hammond B3 organ (7)
- Matt Rollings – acoustic piano (10)
- Rob Graves – acoustic guitar (1, 4, 7, 9), electric guitar (1, 4, 9), programming (2, 5, 6, 8), guitars (2, 3, 5, 6, 8), bass (2, 6, 8), bouzouki (3), percussion programming (4), loops (9)
- Jerry McPherson – electric guitar (2, 9), additional electric guitar (4)
- George Cocchini – additional electric guitar (4)
- Kenny Greenberg – additional electric guitar (5)
- Mike Brignardello – bass (1, 8)
- Joey Canaday – bass (3, 4, 7, 9)
- Steve Brewster – drums (1, 3–5, 7–9)
- Eric Darken – percussion (4)
- Carl Marsh – orchestral arrangements and conductor (3, 6)
- Gavyn Wright – concertmaster (3, 6)
- The London Session Orchestra – orchestra (3, 6)
- John Catchings – cello (10)
- Jerard Woods – backing vocals (1)
- Jovaun Woods – backing vocals (1)
- Lisa Cochran – backing vocals (2)
- Chris Eaton – backing vocals (2)
- Chris Rodriguez – backing vocals (4)
- Jason McArthur – backing vocals (5)

== Production ==
- Dean Diehl – executive producer
- Jason McArthur – A&R direction
- Brown Bannister – producer
- Steve Bishir – engineer, mixing, string engineer (3, 6)
- Hank Nirider – assistant engineer
- Jonathan Allen – string engineer (3, 6)
- Andrew Dudman – string engineer (3, 6)
- Fred Paragano – digital editing
- Steve Hall – mastering
- Stephanie McBrayer – production coordination, creative director, stylist
- Traci Sterling Bishir – production coordination
- Michelle Bentrem – production coordinating assistant
- Scott Hughes – art direction
- Ron Roark – package design
- Tim Parker – additional cover design
- Matt Barnes – photography
- Traci Scrignoli – stylist
- Lori Turk – make-up
- MANN Associates – management

Studios

- Recorded at Paragon Studios and Sound Emporium (Nashville, Tennessee); The Sound Kitchen (Franklin, Tennessee).
- Strings recorded at Abbey Road Studios (London, UK).
- Mixed and Overdubbed at Oxford Sound (Nashville, Tennessee).
- Mastered at Future Disc (Hollywood, California).

== Singles ==
- "Surrender"
  - #9 AC
  - #2 CHR
- "Every Moment"
  - #7 AC
  - #1 CHR (1 week)
- "I Wonder"
  - #16 AC
- "By Surprise"
  - #7 CHR

== Chart performance ==
- #21 Heatseekers
- #31 Top Contemporary Christian
