= Joy Williams (album) =

Studio album by Joy Williams
- Released: August 7, 2001
- Genre: CCM; teen pop; R&B
- Length: 41:48
- Label: Reunion
- Producer: Dan Muckala; Dennis Patton; George King

Joy Williams chronology
Joy Williams (2001)	By Surprise (2002)

Professional ratings
Review scores
Source	Rating
Allmusic	3/5 stars
Jesus Freak Hideout	3.5/5 stars

Joy Williams is the self-titled debut album by contemporary Christian music singer Joy Williams, released on August 7, 2001. In an interview after the album's release, Williams said: "Working on my first album, I wanted the music to be indicative of my relationship with Christ and how I was growing." The album featured the hit singles "Serious" and "I Believe In You".

== Track listing ==
No.	Title	Writer(s)	Length
1.	"It's All Good"	Joy Williams; Dennis Patton	3:56
2.	"No Less"	Dan Muckala; Kari Kimmel	3:52
3.	"I Believe in You"	Dan Muckala; Ty Lacy	4:24
4.	"Up"	Dan Muckala; Regie Hamm	3:19
5.	"Touch Of Faith"	Ty Lacy; Johan Åberg; Sigurd Røsnes	4:02
6.	"Serious"	Dan Muckala; Chuck Butler	3:58
7.	"Home"	Brian McKnight	4:43
8.	"Second Nature"	Joy Williams; Jess Cates; Guy Zabka	3:45
9.	"Better Than I"	John Bucchino	3:53
10.	"Do They See Jesus in Me"	Pete Carlson	5:56
Total length:			41:48

== Personnel ==
- Joy Williams – lead vocals, backing vocals (1, 2, 4–8)
- Dennis Patton – programming (1, 7–9), arrangements (1, 7–9)
- Dan Muckala – tracks (2–6)
- Tom Howard – acoustic piano (10)
- Tim Pierce – acoustic guitar (1, 8, 9), electric guitars (1, 8, 9), nylon guitar (7)
- Alex Nifong – guitars (2, 6)
- Chris Graffagnio – guitars (3–5)
- Stephen Leiwerke – guitars (4)
- David Cleveland – electric guitars (7)
- Mark Hill – bass (7)
- Ken Lewis – percussion (1, 7–9)
- Kari Kimmel – backing vocals (3)
- Peter Penrose – backing vocals (3)
- Crossfire Choir (Marion, Illinois) – choir (9)
- Chris Partain – choir director and arrangements (9)

== Production ==
- Dean Diehl – executive producer
- Dan Mann – executive producer
- George King – executive producer, producer (10)
- Dennis Patton – producer (1, 7–9), additional engineer (1, 7–9)
- Dan Muckala – producer (2–6)
- Richie Biggs – engineer (1, 7–9), mixing (1, 7–9)
- Steve Lotz – engineer (2–6), Pro Tools editing (2–6)
- Bill Deaton – additional engineer (1, 7–9)
- Lynn Fuston – additional engineer (1, 7–9), engineer (10), mixing (10)
- Dan Shike – assistant engineer (2–6)
- F. Reid Shippen – mixing (2, 4–6)
- Tom Laune – mixing (3)
- Jason McArthur – A&R coordinator
- Stephanie McBrayer – production coordinator, stylist
- Scott Hughes – art direction, design
- Tim Parker – art direction, design
- Tony Baker – photography
- Chad Dickerson – stylist
- Katinka – hair, make-up
- MANN Associates – management

Studios

- Recorded at Smokehouse Studio (Franklin, Tennessee); Glorified Mono Studio, Quad Studios and Sidekick Sound Studios (Nashville, Tennessee); Future Music (San Jose, California).
- Mixed at Recording Arts, Quad Studios, Vital Recordings and Bridgeway Studios (Nashville, Tennessee).
