= Safe & Sound (Taylor Swift song) =

2011 song by Taylor Swift featuring the Civil Wars

Promotional single by Taylor Swift featuring the Civil Wars

from the album The Hunger Games: Songs from District 12 and Beyond
- Released: December 26, 2011
- Genre: Indie folk; Americana
- Length: 4:01
- Label: Big Machine
- Songwriters: Taylor Swift; Joy Williams; John Paul White; T Bone Burnett
- Producer: T Bone Burnett

Music video
- "Safe & Sound" on YouTube

"Safe & Sound" is a song by the American singer-songwriter Taylor Swift featuring the American musical duo the Civil Wars, taken from the soundtrack of The Hunger Games (2012). Swift and the Civil Wars wrote the track with its producer T Bone Burnett. The track is an indie folk ballad with a spare arrangement evoking Americana, alternative country, and Appalachian music. The lyrics are about the Hunger Games protagonist Katniss Everdeen's empathy and compassion for other characters, even as she fights to survive in the eponymous Games. Swift sings lead vocals in a fragile, high-pitched tone, while the Civil Wars provide vocal harmonies.

Big Machine Records released "Safe & Sound" for download via the iTunes Store on December 26, 2011. A music video for "Safe & Sound", directed by Philip Andelman and filmed in Watertown, Tennessee, was released on February 13, 2012. Music critics described the production as haunting and eerie and generally praised the songwriting. "Safe & Sound" won Best Song Written for Visual Media at the 55th Annual Grammy Awards in 2013. The song charted in the top 40 and received multi-platinum certifications in Australia and the United States. Following the 2019 dispute over the ownership of Swift's back catalog, she re-recorded "Safe & Sound" and released it as "Safe & Sound (Taylor's Version)" on March 17, 2023, via Republic Records.

== Background and release ==
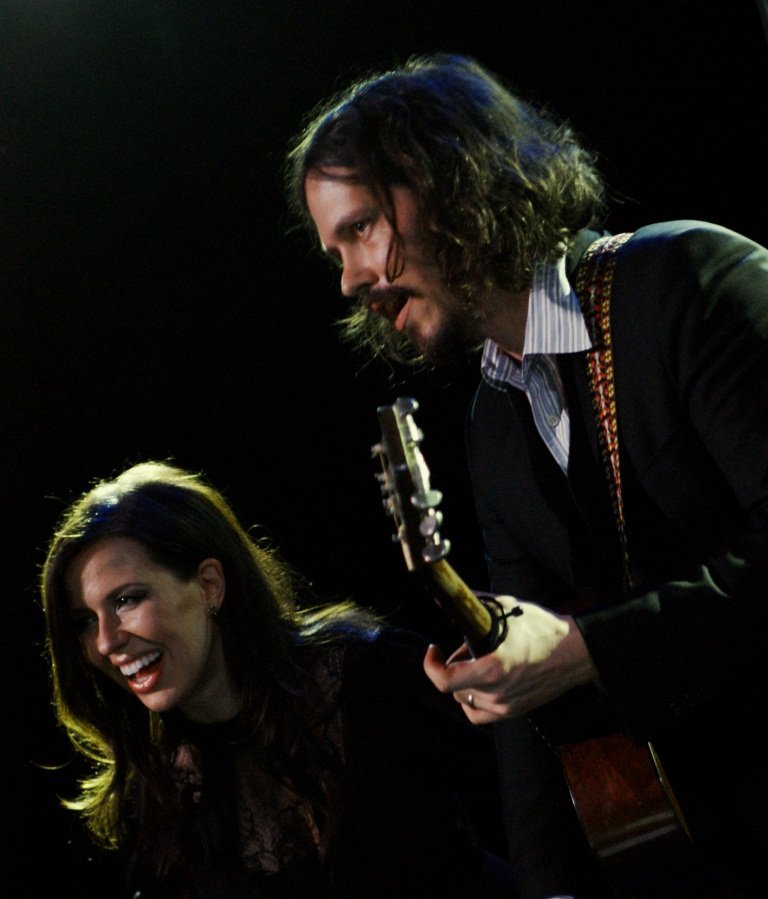
The Civil Wars (pictured) co-wrote and sang vocal harmonies on "Safe & Sound".

T Bone Burnett produced The Hunger Games: Songs from District 12 and Beyond, the soundtrack to the 2012 film The Hunger Games. He recruited other artists to write and record songs for the soundtrack, including Taylor Swift and the folk duo the Civil Wars, consisting of the members Joy Williams and John Paul White. After playing a Los Angeles concert in fall 2011, the Civil Wars were invited to Burnett's house; there, they and Swift together wrote "Safe & Sound" during a two-hour session. Swift had spent two days reading the book to understand the story; the song is told from Katniss Everdeen's perspective. For Swift, who had mostly written autobiographical songs inspired by her personal life, writing from a fictional character's viewpoint was refreshing. The Civil Wars' Joy Williams described working with Burnett as "an amazingly soulful, organic, productive time" and said they were honored to create the song with him and Swift.

On December 26, 2011, Big Machine Records released "Safe & Sound" onto the iTunes Store. Philip Andelman directed the music video for "Safe & Sound", which premiered on MTV on February 13, 2012. Parts of the music video were shot in a cemetery, including a scene of Swift sitting atop the graves of a couple who died in 1853. The video features Swift, walking barefoot through a forest in Watertown, Tennessee, wearing a long white gown. Between scenes, the Civil Wars are seen inside a cottage house sitting in front of a fireplace as they sing along to the song. It contains multiple references to The Hunger Games, including Swift finding a mockingjay pin.

== Composition and lyrics ==
"Safe & Sound"
"Safe & Sound" has a spare acoustic arrangement that evokes Americana, Appalachian music, and indie folk. Swift sings with a high-pitched vibrato and the Civil Wars provide vocal harmonies.

Lionsgate, the producer of The Hunger Games, and Burnett wanted to create music that evoked "what Appalachian music would sound like in 300 years". To this end, "Safe & Sound" features a spare, folk-inspired production, congruent with the story's setting in the Appalachian region. Billboard described it as a folk ballad. The Boot said that it veered towards folk and Americana, NME's Hannah Mylrea and American Songwriter's Savannah Dantona characterized it as indie folk, and Rolling Stone's Monica Herrera found the production reminiscent of alternative country.

In American Songwriter, Evan Schlansky described the track as relying on "a swelling melody" and "built around an escalating run of notes". Swift described Burnett's production as "a lullaby", while critics deemed it melancholy, eerie, or haunting. "Safe & Sound" features Swift on lead vocals, singing with a high-pitched vibrato, and the Civil Wars on vocal harmonies. The production is driven by acoustic and pedal steel guitars. The Star-Ledger's Tris McCall described the acoustic guitar sound as so "brittle" that "it may as well be a banjo". In hindsight, critics commented that the song's folksy production laid the groundwork for the sound of Swift's 2020 albums, Folklore and Evermore.

The lyrics, according to Swift, are about Katniss's empathy and compassion for other characters in different parts of the story. She said of the novel, "I thought it would be an action-adventure type of thing, but it's so much more emotional than that. There's a huge amount of sadness." According to the film's marketing executive, "Safe & Sound" evokes the moment when Katniss realizes her ally and friend Rue has been killed. The narrator tells her loved ones to hide away as "the war outside our door keeps raging on". She grows protective of her loved ones, entreating them to "Hold on to this lullaby even when the music's gone." Christopher John Farley from The Wall Street Journal described the lyrics as "soothing", despite the song's hurtful and dreadful undertone: "Just close your eyes/ The sun is going down/ You'll be alright/ No one can hurt you now." Slant Magazine's Jonathan Keefe suggested though the narrator sings promises of a better tomorrow, the dropping of the instruments in the hook gives the impression that the narrator does not believe it herself.

== Critical reception ==
Upon release, "Safe and Sound" received positive reviews from critics. AllMusic's Heather Phares considered it "the most crucial" track on the Hunger Games soundtrack. Jody Rosen from Rolling Stone gave the song four out of five stars, calling it Swift's "prettiest ballad" and writing that it suggested a novelty in Swift's artistry. This idea was echoed by Jason Lipshutz from Billboard, who called the song a "non-Swiftian anthem that embraces the folksiness of the soundtrack" and McCall, who opined that "her music is getting riskier". Entertainment Weekly's Darren Franich and Spin's Marc Hogan wrote that "Safe & Sound" was a departure from the usual romantic pop songs in Swift's catalog. Franich lauded Swift and the Civil Wars for evoking an atmosphere that suggested the Hunger Games movie to be as "tough and heartfelt" as the books. Hogan wrote that despite his initial disappointment due to the lack of Swift's "usual pop immediacy and clarion songwriting voice", the track turned out to be satisfying later on and contained Swift's "terrifically gorgeous" vocals. Reviewing the soundtrack for Slant Magazine, Jonathan Keefe praised Burnett's production for bringing a "real sense of gravity".

Retrospective reviews of "Safe & Sound" have remained generally positive. In a 2020 review, Idolator's Mike Wass lauded the "sparse" production, Swift's "breathy vocals", and the "menacing lyrics [that] are a testament to her songwriting versatility". Wass said that the track should have been bigger commercially. In June 2022, Insider ranked "Safe & Sound" as Swift's best soundtrack song. Vulture's Nate Jones hailed the song as Swift's "best soundtrack cut by a country mile" and lauded her vibrato vocals that were outside her usual singing range. Rob Sheffield of Rolling Stone agreed: "She explores crevices in her voice she'd never opened up before." NME's Hannah Mylrea described the track as "pretty" and "enthralling", and the staff of Billboard selected it among the 100 best songs by Swift, writing: "The best of her several early-'10s soundtrack contributions, it showed that Swift's musical reach was expanding as quickly as her songwriting maturity." Savannah Dantona of American Songwriter deemed "Safe & Sound" the second-best collaboration of Swift, behind "Me!" (2019), and opined that the track "immortalized the film in a beautiful, Americana-infused ballad".

At the 2012 Country Music Association Awards, "Safe & Sound" was nominated for Musical Event of the Year, but lost to "Feel Like a Rock Star" by Kenny Chesney and Tim McGraw. At the 2012 CMT Music Awards, it was nominated for Video of the Year and Collaborative Video of the Year, but lost to Carrie Underwood's "Good Girl" and Brad Paisley and Carrie Underwood's "Remind Me". The song was nominated for Best Original Song at the 70th Golden Globe Awards in 2013, but lost to Adele's "Skyfall". At the 2013 Grammy Awards, "Safe & Sound" received a nomination for Best Country Duo/Group Performance, but lost to "Pontoon" by Little Big Town, and won Best Song Written for Visual Media.

== Commercial performance ==
Upon its release, "Safe & Sound" debuted and peaked at number 30 on the US Billboard Hot 100; it sold 136,000 digital copies in its first release week. In August 2014, the song was certified double platinum by the Recording Industry Association of America (RIAA). By November 2017, the song had sold 1.9 million copies in the United States. In Canada, it entered the Canadian Hot 100 in January 2012 and later peaked at number 31.

Elsewhere, "Safe & Sound" charted in various Anglophone countries. It peaked at number 67 on the UK Singles Chart and was certified silver by the British Phonographic Industry (BPI). In Oceania, the song reached number 38 on Australia's ARIA Singles Chart and number 11 on New Zealand's RMNZ Singles Chart. In January 2024, it was certified double-platinum Australian Recording Industry Association (ARIA).

== Live performances ==
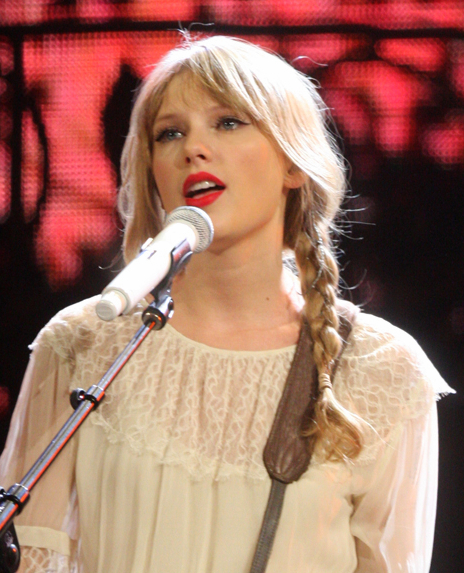
Swift performed "Safe & Sound" during the Australasian leg of her Speak Now World Tour in March 2012.

Swift and the Civil Wars performed "Safe & Sound" live for the first time at a Nashville concert in January 2012. John Paul White played the guitar, over which Swift and Joy Williams sang their parts. During the Australasian leg of the Speak Now World Tour in March 2012, Swift added "Safe & Sound" to the tour's setlist, performing it solo. Swift sang the track while sitting on a couch onstage, wearing a "sparkling, floor-length gown", which, according to Brittany Cooper of Taste of Country, was similar to the style of Belle from Disney's Beauty and the Beast (1991). Cooper was favorable towards the performance, writing: "[Swift] took the song with a whimsical air and gave it all the mystique you would expect from the haunting ballad." The New Zealand Herald's Duncan Grieve, meanwhile, thought that the likes of "Safe & Sound" and "Dear John" were the concert's weakest moments due to their "maudlin balladry".

During the Red Tour in May 2013, Swift performed "Safe & Sound" at the concerts in Philadelphia and Austin. In November 2023, at the second São Paulo concert as part of her Eras Tour, Swift performed "Safe & Sound" on guitar as a "surprise song" outside the regular set list.

== Personnel ==
Adapted from the liner notes of The Hunger Games: Songs from District 12 and Beyond

- Taylor Swift – writer
- Joy Williams – writer
- John Paul White – writer
- T Bone Burnett – producer, writer
- Mike Piersante – recording, mixing
- Jason Wormer – recording

== Charts ==
Chart performance for "Safe & Sound"
Chart (2011–2012)	Peak position
Australia (ARIA)	38
Belgium (Ultratip Bubbling Under Flanders)	62
Canada Hot 100 (Billboard)	31
New Zealand (Recorded Music NZ)	11
Poland Dance (ZPAV)	44
South Korea International Singles (Gaon)	42
UK Singles (Official Charts)	67
US Billboard Hot 100	30

== Certifications ==
Certifications for "Safe & Sound"
Region	Certification	Certified units/sales
Australia (ARIA)	2× Platinum	140,000^{‡}
Brazil (Pro-Música Brasil)	Gold	30,000^{‡}
New Zealand (RMNZ)	Platinum	15,000^{*}
United Kingdom (BPI)	Silver	200,000^{‡}
United States (RIAA)	2× Platinum	2,000,000^{‡}
^{*} Sales figures based on certification alone.^{‡} Sales+streaming figures based on certification alone.

== "Safe & Sound (Taylor's Version)" ==
"Safe & Sound (Taylor's Version)"

Promotional single by Taylor Swift featuring Joy Williams and John Paul White

from the EP The More Red (Taylor's Version) Chapter
- Released: March 17, 2023
- Length: 3:59
- Label: Republic
- Songwriters: Taylor Swift; Joy Williams; John Paul White; T Bone Burnett
- Producers: Taylor Swift; Christopher Rowe; Paul Mirkovich

Audio video
- "Safe & Sound (Taylor's Version)" on YouTube

On March 17, 2023, Swift released "Safe & Sound (Taylor's Version)", a re-recorded version of "Safe & Sound", via Republic Records. The song was part of Swift's re-recording plan following the 2019 dispute over the ownership of the masters of her older discography, after the talent manager Scooter Braun acquired Big Machine Records, including the masters of Swift's albums which the label had released. By re-recording the albums, Swift had full ownership of the new masters, which enabled her to control the licensing of her songs for commercial use and therefore substituted the Big Machine–owned masters.

"Safe & Sound (Taylor's Version)" was released for streaming and download as an independent track without appearing on any album. It was included on a streaming-only compilation titled The More Red (Taylor's Version) Chapter. Due to the Civil Wars having permanently split in 2014, its members Joy Williams and John Paul White are credited separately for their participation in the re-recording. They were reported to have recorded their parts separately. Will Hodgkinson of The Times said that "Safe & Sound (Taylor's Version)" evokes "an intimate, homespun feel".

=== Personnel ===
Credits adapted from Tidal

- Taylor Swift – vocals, songwriter, producer
- Joy Williams – vocals, songwriter
- John Paul White – vocals, songwriter, acoustic guitar
- Christopher Rowe – producer, vocal engineer
- Paul Mirkovich – producer, executive producer, additional engineer, synthesizer
- T Bone Burnett – songwriter
- Nate Morton – drums
- Alexander Sasha Krivtsov – acoustic bass guitar
- Max Bernstein – pedal steel guitar
- Derek Garten – mixer, engineer, editor
- Travis Ference – recording engineer, editor
- Jeff Fitzpatrick – assistant recording engineer
- Justin Derrico – assistant engineer
- Randy Merrill – mastering

=== Charts ===
Chart performance for "Safe & Sound (Taylor's Version)"
Chart (2023)	Peak position
Canada Digital Song Sales (Billboard)	8
New Zealand Hot Singles (RMNZ)	14
UK Singles Downloads (Official Charts)	16
UK Singles Sales (OCC)	16
US Bubbling Under Hot 100 (Billboard)	4
US Digital Song Sales (Billboard)	5
