= Joy Williams (singer) =

American singer

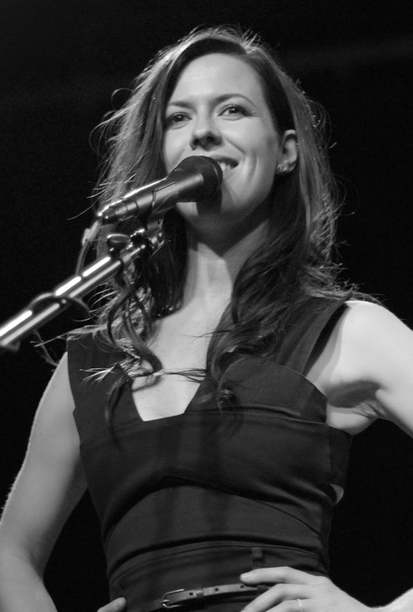
- Williams performing, 2011
- Born: Joy Elizabeth Williams; November 14, 1982 (age 42); West Branch, Michigan, U.S.
- Occupation(s): Singer, songwriter
- Years active: 2000–present
- Spouses: Nate Yetton (m. 2004; div. 2019) Ted Woods (m. 2022)
- Children: 3
- Musical career
- Genres: Contemporary Christian, pop, folk rock
- Instrument(s): Vocals, piano, concertina
- Labels: Reunion; Sensibility Music; Dine Alone; Columbia
- Formerly of: The Civil Wars
- Website: joywilliams.com

Joy Elizabeth Williams (born November 14, 1982) is an American singer-songwriter. The winner of four Grammy Awards, Williams has released five solo albums and four EPs since her self-titled debut in 2001. She was half of The Civil Wars duo from 2009 until 2014.

== Early life ==
Williams was born in West Branch, Michigan, but raised in a Christian home in Mount Hermon in Santa Cruz County, California, where her parents worked in ministry. She attended Valley Christian High School in San Jose and graduated as the class valedictorian in 2001.

In addition to singing in church, Williams began writing faith-based pop songs while living in Santa Cruz. At 17, she was signed by Reunion Records, a subsidiary of Sony/BMG based in Brentwood, Tennessee.

Williams cites Kate Bush, Peter Gabriel, Massive Attack, and Portishead as being her influences.

== Career ==
Between 2001 and 2005, Williams was nominated for 11 Dove Awards, and the three records she released on Reunion cumulatively sold more than 250,000 copies. In 2005, she left the label to expand her musical horizons.

Williams traveled to Europe, worked briefly at Paste Magazine and then at a Nashville boutique. In 2006, she signed a publishing deal with Warner/Chappell music, and in 2008 she co-founded an artist development firm, Sensibility Music, as a vehicle for her career development. That same year Oscar Mayer selected her song "It Doesn't Get Better Than This" for a 2008 marketing campaign. Williams subsequently released three EPs through Sensibility Music. The songs "Charmed Life", "Speaking a Dead Language", and "Sunny Day", were featured on the TV show Grey's Anatomy.

=== The Civil Wars ===
In 2008, Williams attended a writing camp in Nashville, where she met John Paul White. They formed the folk rock duo the Civil Wars in 2009 and released their breakthrough album, Barton Hollow, in 2011. The album was widely praised by critics and went on to sell more than 650,000 copies in the U.S. White and Williams won four Grammy Awards as the Civil Wars.

The duo announced an indefinite hiatus in November 2012, prior to the release of their 2013 self-titled album. The duo was officially dissolved in August 2014 and in March 2015, Williams said her last conversation with White was after their Roundhouse show in London in November 2012.

In 2023, they individually participated in a re-recording of "Safe & Sound" with Taylor Swift, credited under their individual names.

=== Music and acting ===
Late in 2013, Williams collaborated with Chris Cornell on the song "Misery Chain", which they performed on Late Show with David Letterman. She also collaborated with Matt Berninger from The National on "Hush", the theme song for Turn. Williams and Hayley Williams (no relation) of the rock band Paramore collaborated on a new version of Paramore's "Hate to See Your Heart Break".

Williams began working on a solo album, Venus, in 2014, ultimately releasing the record the following year.

Williams made her acting debut in 2016 in an episode of Roadies and her recording of The Chainsmokers' "Don't Let Me Down" was used for a State Farm commercial in 2017.

In 2018, while pregnant with her second child, Williams recorded fifteen songs in a five-day period; of those fifteen songs, twelve were included on her Kenneth Pattengale-produced album, Front Porch, released on May 3, 2019.

== Personal life ==
On June 12, 2004, Williams married Nate Yetton. Williams and Yetton have a son born June 30, 2012; and a daughter born August 6, 2018. In an interview with Pop Matters, Williams stated that she and her husband had "decided to part ways" in early 2019. Williams married Ted Woods in October 2022. Williams gave birth to a son with Woods in December 2023.

== Discography ==
=== Solo ===
- 2001: Joy Williams (Reunion)
- 2002: By Surprise (Reunion)
- 2005: Genesis (Reunion)
- 2005: Connect Sets EP (online only) (Reunion/Sony Connect)
- 2006: Every Moment: The Best of Joy Williams (Reunion)
- 2009: One of Those Days (EP) (Sensibility Music)
- 2009: Charmed Life (Remixes) Digital EP (Sensibility Music)
- 2009: Songs from This/Songs from That (2 EPs) (Sensibility Music)
- 2009: More Than I Asked For: Celebrating Christmas with Joy Williams EP (Sensibility Music)
- 2010: We Mapped the World EP (Sensibility Music)
- 2015: Venus (Sensibility Music)
- 2016: Venus (Acoustic) (Sensibility Music)
- 2019: Front Porch (Sensibility Music)

=== The Civil Wars ===
- 2009: Live at Eddie's Attic (Sensibility Music)
- 2009: Poison & Wine (EP) (Sensibility Music)
- 2011: Barton Hollow (Dine Alone Records)
- 2011: "Tracks in the Snow" (Dine Alone Records)
- 2012: "Live at Amoeba" EP (Dine Alone Records)
- 2013: The Civil Wars (Sensibility Music/Columbia)
- 2013: "VH1 Unplugged" (Dine Alone Records)

== Awards and nominations ==
Year	Association	Category	Nominee	Result	Ref.
2006	Dove Awards	Pop/Contemporary Album of the Year	Genesis	Nominated	
2006	Dove Awards	Pop/Contemporary Recorded Song of the Year	"Hide"	Nominated	
2011	CMT Music Awards	Duo Video of the Year	"Barton Hollow"	Nominated	
2011	Americana Music Association	New/Emerging Artist of the Year	The Civil Wars	Nominated	
2011	Americana Music Association	Duo/Group of the Year	The Civil Wars	Nominated	
2011	Country Music Association Awards	Vocal Duo of the Year	The Civil Wars	Nominated	
2011	ASCAP Awards	ASCAP Vanguard Award	The Civil Wars	Won	
2012	Grammy Award	Best Folk Album	Barton Hollow	Won	
2012	Grammy Award	Best Country Duo/Group Performance	"Barton Hollow"	Won	
2012	CMT Music Awards	Video of the Year	"Safe & Sound" (as featuring)	Nominated	
2012	CMT Music Awards	Collaborative Video of the Year	"Safe & Sound" (as featuring)	Nominated	
2012	CMT Music Awards	Duo Video of the Year	"Poison & Wine"	Nominated	
2012	Americana Music Association	Duo/Group of the Year	The Civil Wars	Won	
2012	A2IM Libera Awards	Album of the Year	Barton Hollow	Nominated	
2012	Country Music Association Awards	Vocal Duo of the Year	The Civil Wars	Nominated	
2012	Country Music Association Awards	Musical Event of the Year	"Safe & Sound" (as featuring)	Nominated	
2013	Grammy Award	Best Country Duo/Group Performance	"Safe & Sound" (as featuring)	Nominated	
2013	Grammy Award	Best Song Written for Visual Media	"Safe & Sound" (as featuring)	Won	
2013	Golden Globe Award	Best Original Song	"Safe & Sound" (as featuring)	Nominated	
2014	Grammy Award	Best Country Duo/Group Performance	"From This Valley"	Won	
2019	Grammy Award	Best Folk Album	Front Porch	Nominated	
