= John Paul White =

American musician (born 1972)

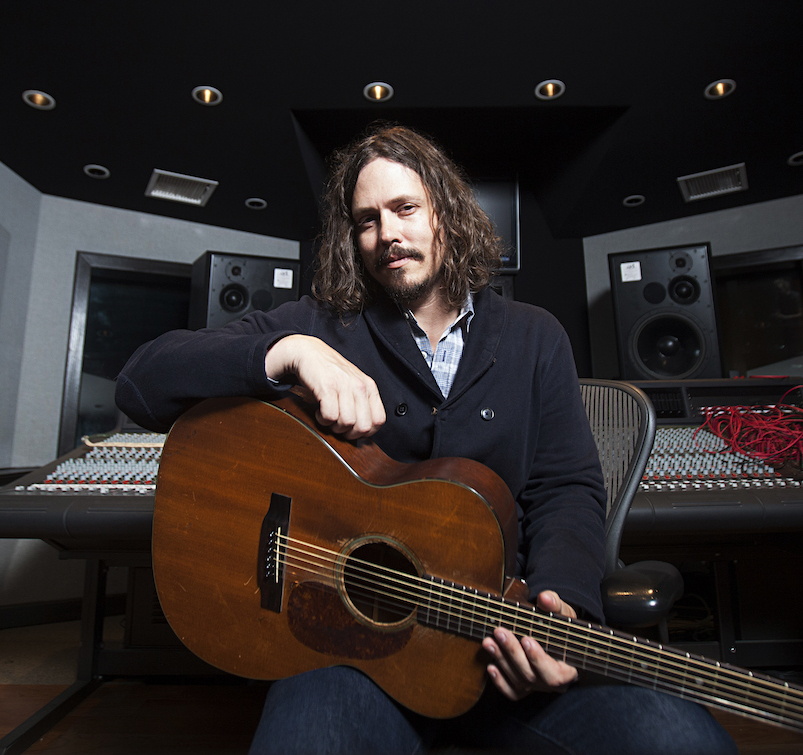
- White c. 2018

Background information
- Born: John Paul White; August 4, 1972 (age 54); Muscle Shoals, Alabama, U.S.
- Origin: Tuscumbia, Alabama, U.S.
- Genres: Folk, country
- Instruments: Vocals, guitar
- Years active: 2008–present
- Label: Single Lock
- Formerly of: The Civil Wars
- Website: johnpaulwhite.com

John Paul White (born August 4, 1972) is an American musician and former member of the Grammy Award-winning duo the Civil Wars. He restarted his solo career with his 2016 release, Beulah.

== Early life ==
White was born in Muscle Shoals, Alabama and grew up in Loretto, Tennessee, on a chicken farm. He attended Sacred Heart School as well as Sacred Heart Catholic Church in Loretto, Tennessee, as a child and graduated from Loretto High School. He is the oldest of four children.

== Career ==
White released his first album independently as the band Nuthin' Fancy. The album was recorded with Jeff Quillen at Rock N Roll Dawg Sound/Studio in his hometown of Loretto, Tennessee.

White released the album The Long Goodbye in 2008. The following year, White joined Joy Williams to form The Civil Wars. The duo won the 2012 Grammy Awards for Best Folk Album, and Country Performance by a Duo or Group.

In 2015, he contributed the song "Kyrie", a duet with Emmylou Harris, to the album Mercyland: Hymns for the Rest of Us, Vol. II. Then in 2016, White released a solo "Simple Song" for the album Southern Family by Dave Cobb.

White is a co-owner of Single Lock Records, which he founded in his hometown of Florence, Alabama, together with Ben Tanner (of the Alabama Shakes) and Florence financial consultant, Will Trapp. The label has signed multiple artists from the Muscle Shoals area, including the legendary "Funky" Donnie Fritts, along with indie standouts like Lera Lynn. White often collaborates with the artists on the Single Lock label.

His album Beulah was released on August 19, 2016.

In 2017, White guested on the song "It Ain't Over Yet" with Rodney Crowell and Rosanne Cash. The track appeared on Crowell's album Close Ties.

In 2018, White embarked on a house concert tour to get feedback on new material and in April 2019 released the album The Hurting Kind. The album was a bit of a departure from White's Southern Rock and Americana roots, and was an intentional tribute to the country music he grew up listening to. White co-wrote "I Wish I Could Write You a Song" with "Whispering" Bill Anderson, resulting in a distinctly Orbison feel on the track. White toured in 2019 with several Single Lock artists, including acclaimed newcomer Erin Rae.

In 2023, White and Williams individually participated in a re-recording of "Safe & Sound" with Taylor Swift, credited under their individual names.

== Personal life ==
White lives in Florence, Alabama, with his wife Jenny and their four children.

== Discography ==
=== Solo ===
- The Long Goodbye (2008) Arkam Records
- Beulah (2016) Single Lock Records
- The Hurting Kind (2019) Single Lock Records

=== The Civil Wars ===
- Live at Eddie's Attic (2009)
- Poison & Wine (EP) (2009)
- Barton Hollow (2011)
- Unplugged On VH1 (2013)
- The Civil Wars (2013)
