= The Civil Wars =

American musical duo

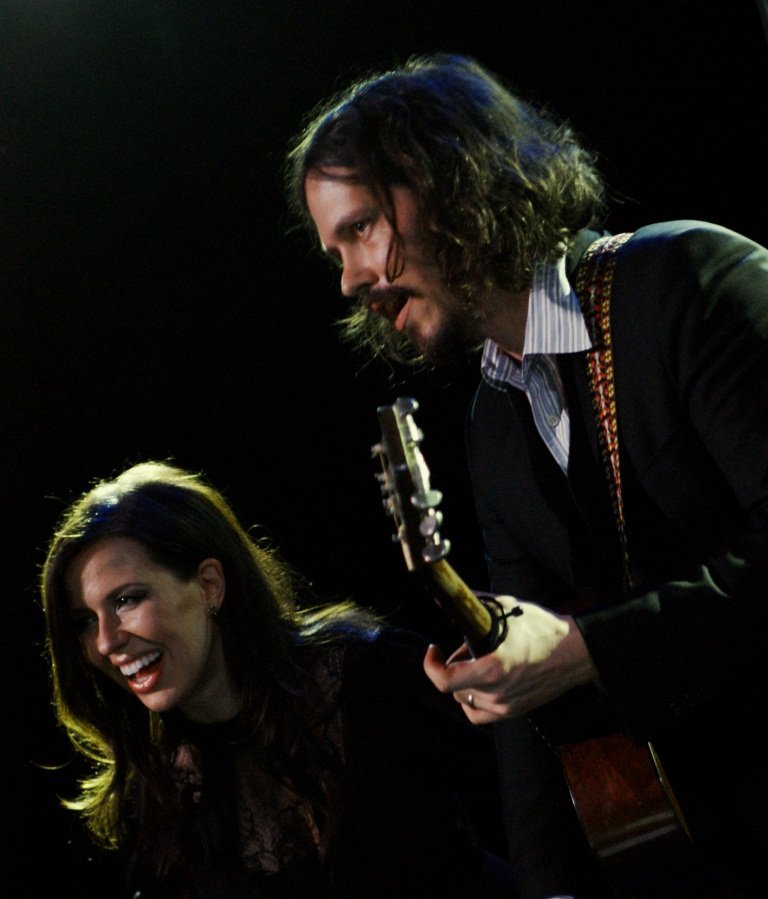
- The Civil Wars in 2012

Background information
- Origin: Nashville, Tennessee, U.S.
- Genres: Americana, country folk, indie folk
- Years active: 2009–2014; 2023
- Labels: sensibility, Columbia
- Past members: Joy Williams; John Paul White

The Civil Wars were an American musical duo composed of Joy Williams and John Paul White. Formed in 2008, their style blended folk, country, and Americana, characterized by haunting harmonies and poignant lyrics.

The duo gained recognition with their debut album Barton Hollow in 2011, which won two Grammy Awards. Their eponymous second album was released in 2013 and further solidified their success. They won two additional Grammy Awards before their breakup in 2014.

== History ==
=== 2008–2010: Formation ===
Both Williams and White had solo careers prior to meeting at a songwriting workshop in Nashville in 2008. Williams had recorded several moderately successful albums and was signed as a songwriter to Warner/Chappell; White had independently released The Long Goodbye—which was originally set to be released through a deal with Capitol Records—and was writing for EMI Music. At the workshop, approximately 25 songwriters were assembled by music publishers to write radio singles for an unnamed band later identified as the country group Gloriana. Williams and White were randomly paired to write together, and quickly discovered an affinity. In a 2012 interview, Williams said that "when he started singing it was like I knew where he was going to go before he went there." In the same interview, White said that when he and Williams "started singing together, there was this weird click; it was like there was a dance going where I knew I could lead her but she could lead me, too." Following the workshop, White and Williams made immediate plans to meet again. They wrote the song "Falling" during their first session, which took place at Williams' house.

Looking for a name for the project, Williams came up with the Civil Wars, which has no historical meaning, but rather is based on the quote "be kind, for everyone you meet is fighting a great battle" attributed to Ian Maclaren. According to Williams, "as I was thinking about the music we make, that sense of battle seemed applicable." The duo performed for the first time as The Civil Wars at the French Quarter Cafe in Nashville on April 7, 2009. Williams' former producer Charlie Peacock was in attendance, and impressed by their dynamics and on-stage chemistry, began working with them the following day.

On April 8, 2009, Shalom Aberle recorded The Civil Wars' second live show, opening for Will Hoge at Eddie's Attic. Eight of the songs that were recorded that night were on Live at Eddie's Attic, which was released on June 30, 2009 as a free download on The Civil Wars' website. In addition to a live and demo version of "Falling", the record included "Poison & Wine", covers of Leonard Cohen's "Dance Me to the End of Love", and Sade's "No Ordinary Love", and "If I Didn't Know Better", which was later covered in an episode of Nashville. Released through Sensibility Music, a recording, marketing, licensing and management company established by Williams and her husband, Civil Wars manager Nate Yetton, Live at Eddie's Attic had been downloaded more than 700,000 times as of 2014.

In November 2009, "Poison & Wine" was used in its entirety as a needle drop during a pivotal montage at the end of the ninth episode of season six of Grey's Anatomy. At the time, the song was available only on Live at Eddie's Attic. White, Williams and Yetton found out about the placement only four days prior to the episode's airing. They uploaded the newly recorded version of the song to iTunes, and created a music video for "Poison & Wine" in an afternoon. As the video was being put online, Williams and White were watching the Grey's Anatomy episode, and the uploading was completed almost to the second that the last note of the song played. Through Grey's Anatomy, The Civil Wars were exposed to a substantial national audience, which included Taylor Swift, who declared her love for The Civil Wars via Twitter. "Poison & Wine" was released a week after Grey's Anatomy aired, and debuted at #4 on the iTunes Singer/Songwriter chart.

The duo toured consistently throughout 2009 and 2010.

=== 2011–2012: Barton Hollow ===
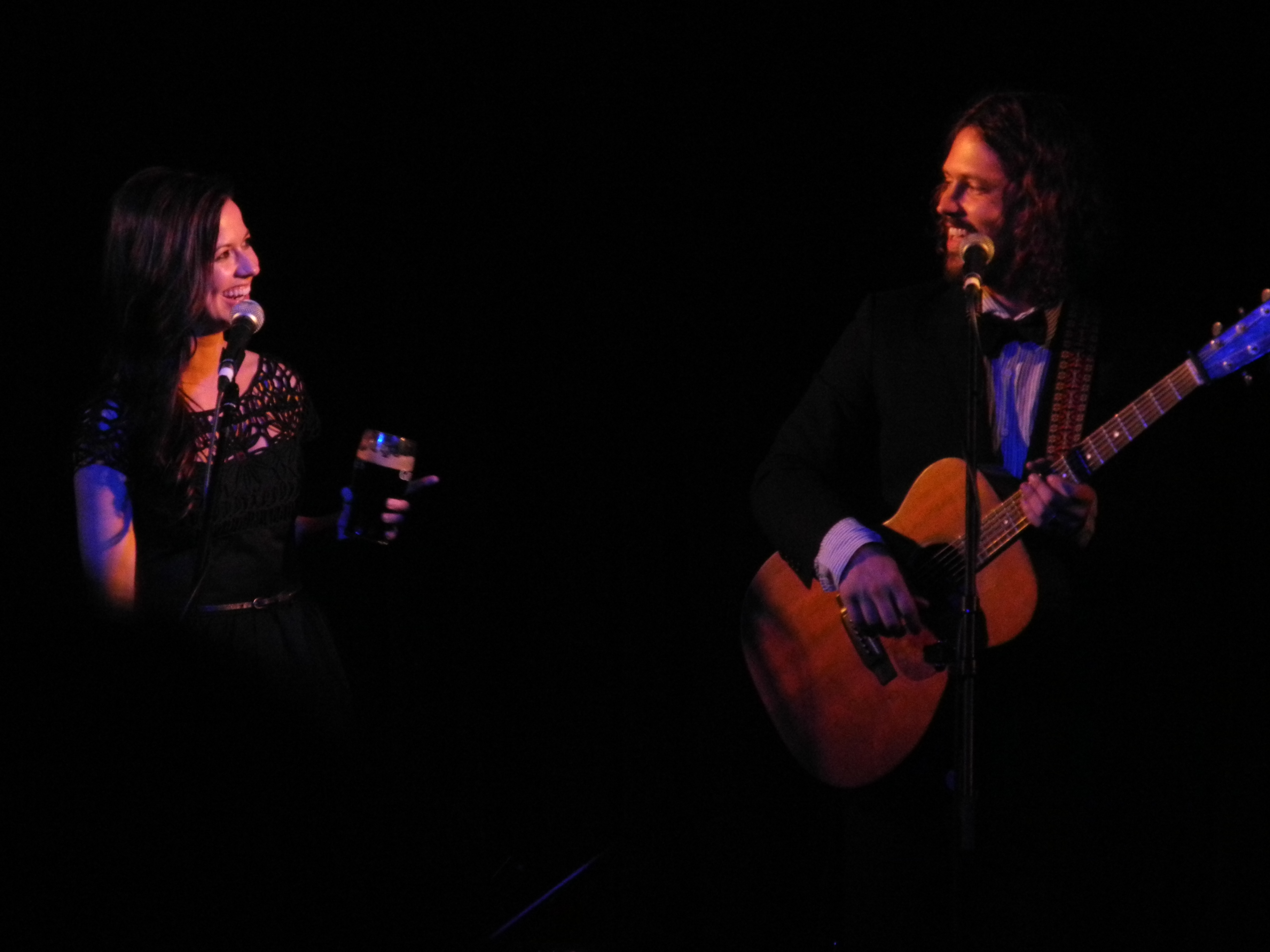
The Civil Wars performing at The Sugar Club, Dublin in September 2011

Williams, White, and Peacock returned to the Art House to record The Civil Wars debut album, Barton Hollow, which was released on February 1, 2011. Recorded in the studio's sanctuary and in the more conventional Studio A Live Room, the production was built around vocals, acoustic guitar and piano, with drums, percussion and overdubs largely absent. Aided in part by a January appearance on The Tonight Show with Jay Leno and support from Swift, Hillary Scott of Lady A, and Sara Bareilles, Barton Hollow was the #1 downloaded album on iTunes the week it was released. It also charted at #1 on the Billboard Digital Albums chart, #1 on the Billboard Folk Albums chart, #2 on the Rock Albums Chart, and at #10 on the Billboard 200.

Barton Hollow received significant critical acclaim. The BBC wrote "A timeless, anachronistic record, Barton Hollow could be from 30 years ago, or it could be from 30 years hence. What’s certain, though, is that you truly feel it in the here and now," while the New York Daily News wrote "With care and delicacy, they curate their notes, stitching together a sound that's sharp, arch and almost achingly fine." The album appeared on the "Best of 2011" lists for NPR Music, Rolling Stone, and Entertainment Weekly, among others, and it was listed at #9 in the "Top 10 of Everything in 2011" in Time.

For most of the year, White and Williams toured the US and Canada non-stop. In May and June, they toured with Adele, who wrote on her blog, "I have the complete honour of having a band called The Civil Wars on the tour at the moment. They are by far the BEST live band I have EVER seen." They toured with Adele in Europe later in the year, prior to the international release of Barton Hollow. By October, Barton Hollow, which was released independently through Sensibility, had sold more than 195,000 copies. In November, The Civil Wars put out a 4-song EP, Tracks in the Snow.

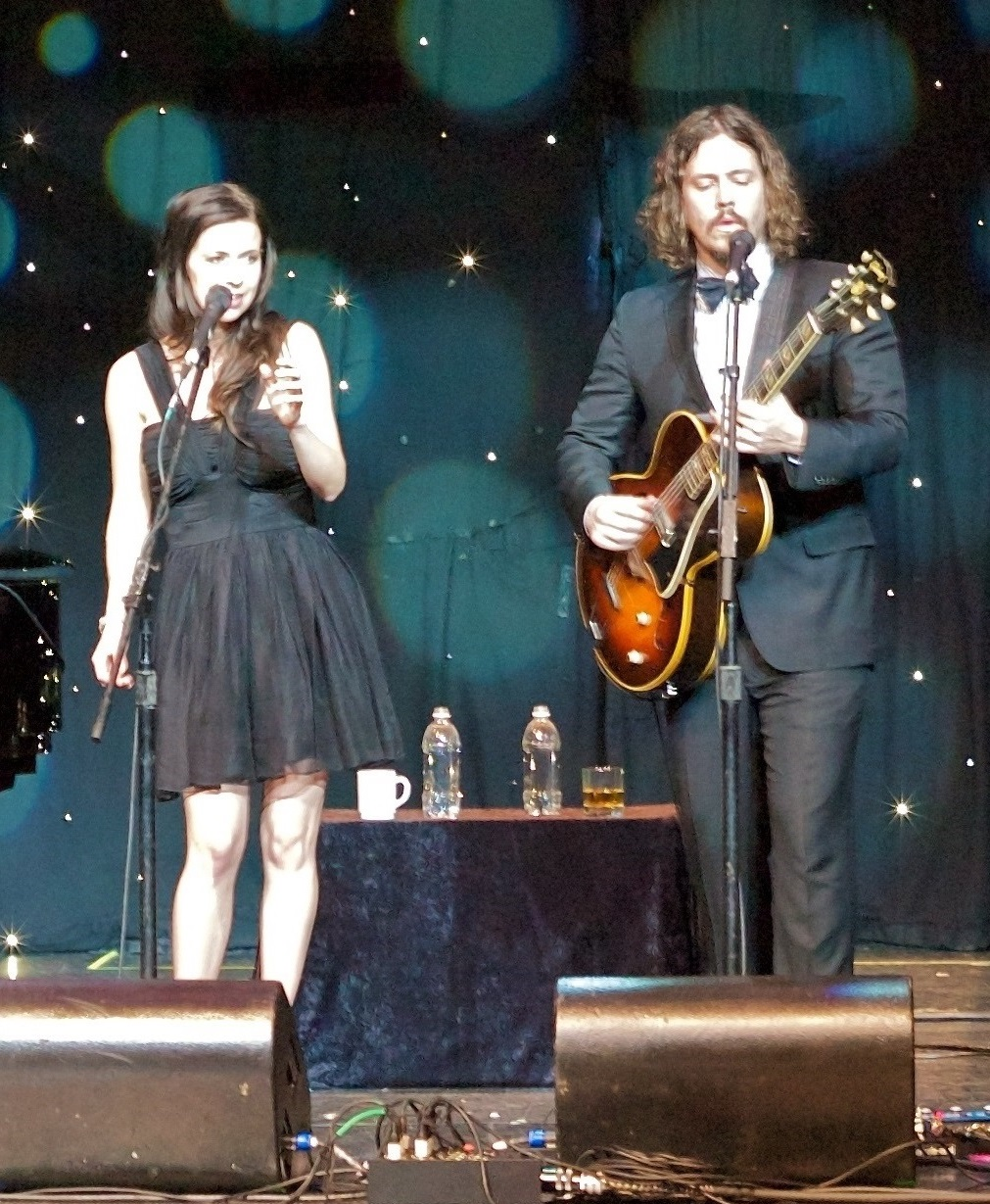
The Civil Wars in 2012

The Civil Wars were nominated for a 2011 Country Music Association Award in the Vocal Duo of the Year category, and in the Duo/Group of the Year and Emerging Artist of the Year categories for the Americana Music Awards. They received the Vanguard Award at the 49th Annual ASCAP Country Music Awards, Also in 2011, Williams and White teamed with Taylor Swift and T-Bone Burnett to write "Safe & Sound", a track for The Hunger Games: Songs from District 12 and Beyond. The song, performed by The Civil Wars and Swift, and produced by Burnett, was written and recorded in a single day. It was released on iTunes in the US December 26.

White and Williams again began 2012 on tour. In February in Los Angeles, The Civil Wars won two Grammy Awards for Barton Hollow: Best Folk Album and Best Country Duo/Group Performance. They performed part of "Barton Hollow" on the Grammy telecast, and introduced Swift, who played "Mean." In March, Barton Hollow was released internationally and Williams and White completed their first European tour.

Later in the year, just as Barton Hollow was certified gold in the US, they began working on their second full-length album with Charlie Peacock, which they wrote while on the road at the suggestion of Rick Rubin, who also produced a track for the album. On October 28, White and Williams began their first extensive tour in the UK and Europe. On November 6, after a performance at the Roundhouse in London, they announced that they were cancelling the remaining tour dates, due to "internal discord and irreconcilable differences of ambition." They offered no further explanation, although in a 2013 interview with The New York Times, Williams said their last performances were "excruciating."

=== 2013–2014: The Civil Wars and separation ===
In January, Williams and White released The Civil Wars: Unplugged on VH1 exclusively through iTunes. The seven-song album was recorded when The Civil Wars did a VH1 Unplugged set in early 2012. In February, Williams, White, Swift and Burnett won the Grammy Award for Best Song Written For Visual Media for "Safe & Sound", which was also nominated for a Golden Globe. The following month, it was announced that The Civil Wars had teamed with Burnett to record the soundtrack for A Place at the Table, a documentary that examined the role hunger plays in the lives of American families. Burnett and The Civil Wars recorded 14 new songs—together and separately—for the soundtrack. The proceeds from the soundtrack, recorded in Austin in 2011, were donated to the Participant Foundation. It was released on February 26.

The Civil Wars, the album that White and Williams had begun recording with Peacock in mid-2012, was released in August through Sensibility/Columbia. White remained at his home in Florence, Alabama with his wife and four children, while Williams and Peacock did interviews to support the release. Peacock said that the strain was evident from the start of the recording process, and that White and Williams seemed to be pulling in different directions. Williams disclosed that she and White hadn't spoken since the record was completed. The album entered the US Billboard charts and the digital charts at No. 1, and debuted in the UK at No. 2. Barton Hollow—which spent five weeks in the Top 40—moved to the top position on the catalog charts. Between the Bars, a four-song EP that covered Elliott Smith's title track, Portishead's "Sour Times", Michael Jackson's "Billie Jean" and The Romantics' "Talking in Your Sleep" was released in the late 2013.

In February 2014, White and Williams won their fourth Grammy, this time for the track "From This Valley" from The Civil Wars. It won for Best Country Duo/Group Performance. The Civil Wars announced that they would permanently part ways on August 5, and offered a free download of "You Are My Sunshine" as a parting gift. Williams wrote: "I am saddened and disappointed by the ending of this duo, to say the very least. JP is a tremendous musician, and I will always be grateful for the music we were able to create together." White's statement read: "I would like to express sincere thanks to all who were a part of the arc of The Civil Wars—from the beginning, to the end, and all points in between."

=== Post separation ===
In 2023, they individually participated in a re-recording of "Safe & Sound" with Taylor Swift, credited under their individual names.

In June 2025, they released The One that Got Away (The Best of the Civil Wars), a greatest hits album.

== Discography ==
- Barton Hollow (2011)
- The Civil Wars (2013)

== Awards and nominations ==
Year	Association	Category	Nominee	Result
2011	CMT Music Awards	Duo Video of the Year	"Barton Hollow"	Nominated
2011	Americana Music Association	New/Emerging Artist of the Year	The Civil Wars	Nominated
2011	Americana Music Association	Duo/Group of the Year	The Civil Wars	Nominated
2011	Country Music Association Awards	Vocal Duo of the Year	The Civil Wars	Nominated
2011	ASCAP Awards	ASCAP Vanguard Award	The Civil Wars	Won
2012	2012 Grammy Award	Best Folk Album	Barton Hollow	Won
2012	2012 Grammy Award	Best Country Duo/Group Performance	"Barton Hollow"	Won
2012	CMT Music Awards	Video of the Year	"Safe & Sound" (as featuring)	Nominated
2012	CMT Music Awards	Collaborative Video of the Year	"Safe & Sound" (as featuring)	Nominated
2012	CMT Music Awards	Duo Video of the Year	"Poison & Wine"	Nominated
2012	Americana Music Association	Duo/Group of the Year	The Civil Wars	Won
2012	A2IM Libera Awards	Album of the Year	Barton Hollow	Nominated
2012	Country Music Association Awards	Vocal Duo of the Year	The Civil Wars	Nominated
2012	Country Music Association Awards	Musical Event of the Year	"Safe & Sound" (as featuring)	Nominated
2013	2013 Grammy Award	Best Country Duo/Group Performance	"Safe & Sound" (as featuring)	Nominated
2013	2013 Grammy Award	Best Song Written for Visual Media	"Safe & Sound" (as featuring)	Won
2013	2012 Golden Globe Award	Best Original Song	"Safe & Sound" (as featuring)	Nominated
2014	2014 Grammy Award	Best Country Duo/Group Performance	"From This Valley"	Won
