= Lil B discography =

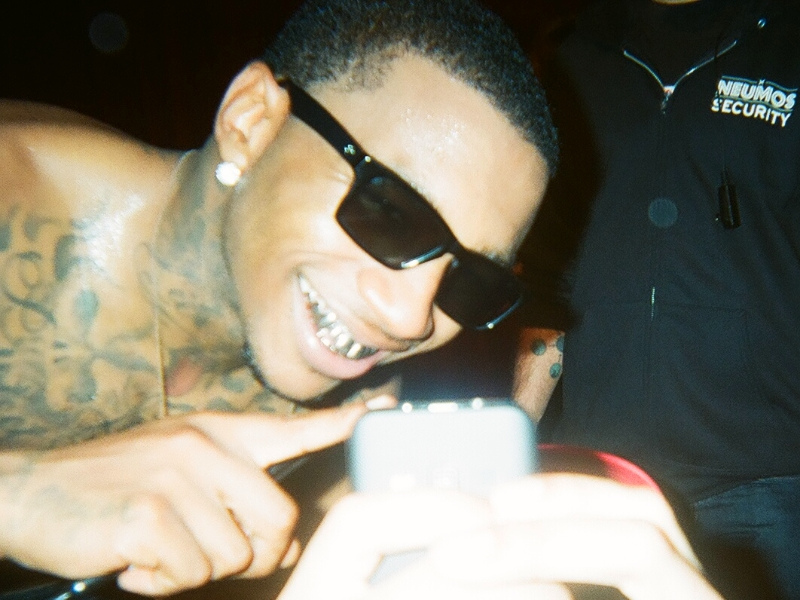
- Lil B in 2012
- Studio albums: 3
- EPs: 3
- Mixtapes: 70
- Collaborative albums: 2
- Instrumental albums: 3
- Live albums: 2

This is the discography of the American rapper Lil B. He has released 70 mixtapes, 3 studio albums, 3 EPs, 2 collaborative albums, 3 Instrumental albums and 2 live albums.

== Mixtapes ==
All mixtapes were released for digital download via Basedworld Records, and did not appear on any charts, unless noted otherwise.

- S.S. Mixtape Vol. 1 (with Young L as Young World) (November 27, 2007) (Note: Released under Young L Productions)
- S.S. Mixtape Vol. 2 (with Young L as Young World) (August 11, 2009) (Note: Released under Legendary Inc.)
- I'm Thraxx (September 24, 2009)
- 6 Kiss (December 22, 2009)
- Paint (January 11, 2010)
- Dior Paint (March 25, 2010)
- Roses Exodus (June 10, 2010)
- Everything Based (July 23, 2010)
- Blue Flame (September 13, 2010)
- MF Based (September 27, 2010)
- Gold Dust (October 19, 2010)
- Where Did the Sun Go? (November 5, 2010)
- Red Flame (November 9, 2010)
- Evil Red Flame (November 25, 2010)
- Red Flame: Devil Music Edition (February 18, 2011)
- Illusions of Grandeur (March 10, 2011)
- Bitch Mob Respect da Bitch (May 16, 2011)
- I Forgive You (August 28, 2011)
- Black Flame (September 13, 2011)
- The Silent President (October 11, 2011)
- BasedGod Velli (November 14, 2011)
- Blue Eyes (December 20, 2011)
- Goldhouse (December 25, 2011)
- White Flame (January 31, 2012)
- Gods Father (February 27, 2012)
- #1 Bitch (March 30, 2012)
- The Basedprint 2 (April 9, 2012)
- Trapped in BasedWorld (April 25, 2012)
- Water Is Dmg (May 29, 2012)
- Green Flame (June 23, 2012)
- Rich After Taxes (July 5, 2012)
- 855 Song Based Freestyle Mixtape (July 10, 2012)
- Task Force (July 21, 2012)
- Obama BasedGod (July 30, 2012)
- Based Jam (August 29, 2012)
- Frozen Based Freestyle Mixtape (September 7, 2012)
- Illusions of Grandeur 2 (October 9, 2012)
- Halloween H20 (October 29, 2012)
- Crime Fetish (November 22, 2012)
- Glassface (December 8, 2012)
- Pink Flame (February 3, 2013)
- Pyt Pretty Young Thug Mixtape (March 24, 2013)
- 100% Percent Gutta (June 10, 2013)
- 05 Fuck Em (December 24, 2013)
- Basedworld Paradise (February 16, 2014)
- Hoop Life (June 1, 2014)
- Ultimate Bitch (October 14, 2014)
- Free (Based Freestyles Mixtape) (with Chance the Rapper) (August 5, 2015)
- Thugged Out Pissed Off (December 30, 2015)
- Black Ken (August 17, 2017) (Note: Debuted and peaked at number 44 on the US Billboard Independent Albums chart, and number 24 on the Heatseekers Albums chart)
- Platinum Flame (May 15, 2018)
- Options (October 17, 2018)
- 28 wit a Ladder (April 14, 2019)
- The Hunchback of BasedGod (August 28, 2019)
- Loyalty Casket (November 11, 2019)
- 30 wit a Hammer (January 2, 2020)
- Trap Oz (February 10, 2020)
- Gutta Dealership (April 9, 2020)
- Bruno wit da Pruno (July 28, 2020)
- Hoop Life 2 (November 30, 2020)
- Santa (March 15, 2021)
- Red Flame After the Fire (October 31, 2021)
- The Frozen Tape (June 16, 2022)
- Frozen (June 16, 2022)
- Call of Duty Task Force (December 20, 2022)
- Bitch Mob tha Album (June 15, 2023)
- B - Unit (August 9, 2023)
- BasedGods Pro Skater (October 23, 2023)
- Winged Wheelchair Squad (December 18, 2023)
- The Book of Flame (June 4, 2024)

== Albums ==
=== Studio albums ===
List of albums, with selected chart positions.
Title	Album details	Peak chart positions	
Title	Album details	US Heat	US R&B/HH
Rain in England	Released: September 21, 2010; Label: BasedWorld, Weird Forest; Formats: CD, digital download, LP	—	—
Angels Exodus	Released: January 18, 2011; Label: BasedWorld, Amalgam Digital; Formats: Digital download	—	—
I'm Gay (I'm Happy)	Released: June 29, 2011; Label: BasedWorld, Amalgam Digital; Formats: Digital download	20	56

=== Live albums ===
List of live albums
Title	Album details
Lil B Live in Baltimore	Released: December 28, 2010; Label: BasedWorld; Formats: Digital download
Lil B Speaks at NYU and Lectures Unscripted! Must Have!	Released: May 17, 2012; Label: BasedWorld; Formats: Digital download

=== Extended plays ===
List of extended plays, with selected chart positions.
Title	Album details
Skateboards 2 Scrapers (with The Pack)	Released: December 19, 2006; Label: Up All Nite, Zomba, Jive; Formats: CD, digital download
Pretty Boy Millionaires (with Soulja Boy)	Released: July 5, 2010; Label: SOD Money Gang, Basedworld; Formats: Digital download
Mm Christmas	Released: December 24, 2010; Label: Basedworld Records; Formats: Digital download

=== Collaboration albums ===
List of collaboration albums, with selected chart positions
Title	Album details	Peak chart positions		
Title	Album details	US Heat	US R&B/HH	US Ind
Based Boys (with The Pack)	Released: October 30, 2007; Label: Up All Nite, Zomba, Jive; Formats: CD, digital download	14	57	46
Wolfpack Party (with The Pack)	Released: August 24, 2010; Label: Indie Pop, SMC; Formats: CD, digital download	13	65	—
"—" denotes a title that did not chart, or was not released in that territory.

=== Instrumental albums ===
List of Instrumental albums, with selected chart positions.
Title	Album details	Peak chart positions
Title	Album details	US New Age
Choices and Flowers (as The BasedGod)	Released: May 17, 2012; Label: BasedWorld Records; Formats: Digital download	6
Tears 4 God (as The BasedGod)	Released: December 30, 2012; Label: BasedWorld Records; Formats: Digital download	—
Afrikantis	Released: December 22, 2022; Label: BasedWorld Records; Formats: Digital download	—
"—" denotes a title that did not chart, or was not released in that territory.

=== Compilation mixtapes ===
List of compilation albums, with year released
Title	Album details
Based Blunts Vol. 1	Released: September 23, 2009; Label: Cocaineblunts.com; Format: Digital download
Free Music: The Complete Myspace Collection	Released: February 10, 2011; Label: BasedWorld Records; Format: Digital Download
848 Song Based Freestyle Mixtape	Released: July 2, 2012; Label: BasedWorld Records; Format: Digital download

== Singles ==
=== As lead artist ===
List of singles as a lead artist, showing year released and album name
Title	Year	Album
"Meet Young Bitch Remix" (featuring Soulja Boy)	2009	—N/a
"I'm Paris Hilton"	2010	Blue Flame
"Wonton Soup"	2010	Everything Based and Blue Flame
"Show Me Sum"	2010	—N/a
"Charlie Sheen"	2011	—N/a
"Get Em"	2011	Red Flame: Devil Music Edition
"Justin Bieber"	2011	—N/a
"Keep My Eyes Open 2"	2011	White Flame
"See Ya"	2012	God's Father
"I'm Like Killah"	2012	Goldhouse
"Like a Gun"	2012	Task Force
"California Boy"	2012	—N/a
"Katy Perry"	2014	Hoop Life
"Murder Rate"	2014	—N/a
"I'ma Sell"	2020	30 wit a Hammer
"Pour a Cup"	2020	30 wit a Hammer
"I'm Kanye"	2020	Trap Oz
"Save the Planet"	2020	Trap Oz
"I am George Floyd"	2020	Bruno wit da Pruno
"Pushing Peace"	2022	Frozen
"Shine"	2022	BasedGods Pro Skater

== Other charted songs ==
Title	Year	Peak chart positions			Album
Title	Year	US	CAN	WW	Album
"Dadz Love" (with Justin Bieber)	2025	84	65	145	Swag

== Guest appearances ==
List of guest appearances, with other performing artists, showing year released and album name
Title	Year	Other artist(s)	Album
"Profilin'"	2007	DJ Fresh, Shady Nate	Based on a True Story
"So Simple"	2008	The Cataracs, Jay Ant	The 13th Grade EP
"Lighthouse"	2008	Ruben Stunner, Shady Nate	Stunnerholic (VOL. 1) - Take A Picture B*tch
"Getting Brains Everyday"	2009	Keyboard Kid	—N/a
"Money and the Power"	2009	Main Attrakionz, Deezy D	Self Made Classic: Zombies on tha Turf
"100 Thousand"	2009	Deezy D, Squadda B, Gaitta	North Pole Movement
"Hatin' on Me"	2009	Deezy D	Loady Load Vol. 1: Revamped 07-08 Classics
"Meet Young Bitch"	2009	Soulja Boy	Paranormal Activity
"Goon 2 a Goblin"	2009	Deezy D, Tune Baby	Loady Load Sky: Freestyle Edition
"Based Freestyle"	2009	Deezy D	Loady Load Sky: Freestyle Edition
"I'm da Man"	2009	Deezy D, Tune Baby	Loady Load Sky: Freestyle Edition
"Bad Captain Swag"	2010	Sole and the Skyrider Band, Pictureplane	Hello Cruel World
"Trap Ball"	2010	Danny Brown, Tony Yayo	Hawaiian Snow
"Trippin'"	2010	Danny Brown, Tony Yayo	Hawaiian Snow
"30 Thousand 100 Million"	2010	Soulja Boy, Arab	The DeAndre Way
"Break Yourself"	2010	Gucci Mane	Diplo Presents: Free Gucci (The Best of the Cold War Mixtapes)
"Amerikaz Most Wanted"	2010	King Chip	Independence Day
"Kiss my Ass"	2010	J.K. the Reaper	I'm a Loser Volume 1.5: The Mini-Mixtape
"Ass on Deck"	2010	Yung Berg, Too $hort	Ground Work
"Grove St. Party Freestyle"	2011	Lil Wayne	Sorry 4 the Wait
"Base For Your Face"	2011	9th Wonder, Jean Grae, Phonte	The Wonder Years
"Based"	2011	Tony Yayo	Gunpowder Guru 3
"Lindsay Lohan"	2011	AC	—N/a
"Rich Hoe"	2011	Soulja Boy	Juice
"Pretty Boy"	2011	Soulja Boy	The Last Crown
"Stupid (Remix)"	2011	Roach Gigz, Husalah	Bitch I'm a Player
"So Gone (Based Remix)"	2011	Rockie Fresh	The Otherside: Redux
"All Over the World"	2011	Yung Berg	Reality Check
"Radio"	2011	Blanco	Portrait of a Serial Killer
"Bad Bitches"	2012	Star Slinger, Stunnaman	—N/a
"Loyalty"	2012	Kurt Diggler	My Bottom Bitch
"I See U"	2012	Retro	Ain't Easy Being Peezy
"Bird Talk (Remix)"	2013	Fredo Santana	—N/a
"Make It Work (Remix)"	2014	Soulja Boy	—N/a
"I Got That Sack"	2014	Soulja Boy	King Soulja II
"Rolling Stone"	2015	Gucci Mane	Views From Zone 6
"Bitches Ain't Shit"	2015	Gucci Mane, Sy Ari Da Kid, Riff Raff	Trapology
"Time Flies"	2015	Mac Miller	GO:OD AM
"Irri"	2015	Chief Keef	Bang 3, Pt. 2
"Embarrassed"	2015	Gucci Mane, Post Malone, Riff Raff	East Atlanta Santa 2
"Bet I Fuck Your Bitch"	2015	Keith Jenkins	Black Bart
"Ima Do Me"	2015	Lil Rue	The Dead End
"Free Love"	2016	Vic Mensa, Le1f, Halsey, Malik Yusef	—N/a
"Be Somebody"	2016	Clams Casino, ASAP Rocky	32 Levels
"Witness"	2016	Clams Casino	32 Levels
"32 Levels"	2016	Clams Casino, Joe Newman	32 Levels
"Flash on These Bitches"	2016	E-40	The D-Boy Diary: Book 2
"Slam Dunk"	2017	Young L	Final Fantasy
"Waiting Here"	2018	Wicca Phase Springs Eternal	—N/a
"Motorola"	2018	Carnage (DJ)	Battered Bruised & Bloody
"Rag & Bone (Remix)"	2018	Adamn Killa	—N/a
"Stab You When You're Dead"	2018	Darko the Super	Thank You Based God
"Up N Up"	2018	Laroo, DJ Hitta Slim, Pinky Killacorn	Face Card
"Demons"	2018	DeathbyRomy	Monsters
"Goku"	2018	Cam The Underacheefer	—N/a
"U.O.E Notice It"	2019	AE BUDIS	—N/a
"Same Ol"	2019	Yung Knxw	Nobody Knxws
"Justin Bieber"	2019	CATXSCAN	Loves Exodus
"Foyb (A Career Move)"	2019	Baha Bla$t	Career Move
"G.a.S."	2019	Baha Bla$t	Career Move
"House Boi"	2019	KirbLaGoop	No Feelings
"Ramen Noodles (Remix)"	2019	Vammy Tsunami	—N/a
"Money Dance"	2019	Yung Thot	Thottin Hours
"Everglade Fade (Remix)"	2019	Swamp G, Rishaddd	Swamp Story 4
"Chef"	2019	Joey Padilla, Alex Miller	Music Has No Rules
"Cartier Wrist"	2019	Smoke Ao	—N/a
"Gas"	2019	OB.V.US	Next Level
"In the Bag"	2019	RIP Flow, Eros Taylor	—N/a
"Trappin' On Twitch"	2019	Rev Raps	$tarcade
"Movie Star"	2019	Stan Lane	—N/a
"History in the Making"	2019	Squadda B, Dope G	Squadda Mania
"ERRYBODYGAY"	2019	Lil Phag, Dr. Woke, Baha Bla$t	resERECTION
"Style For Free"	2019	Chad McClain	—N/a
"Let Me Know"	2019	J. Morgan, Stife	Can I Live
"All or Nothing"	2019	Shinobi Klan	Shinobi Klan, Vol. 1
"Based Camp"	2019	Ba$ecamp	—N/a
"I S S U E D"	2019	Gelapi, Chuckthespittah	M.A.D
"Fuck a 9 to 5"	2019	Keyboard Kid	—N/a
"Break the Bank (Remix)"	2019	Keyboard Kid, Squadda B	—N/a
"Light Out"	2019	Ka5sh	—N/a
"Love Is an Energy"	2019	Motëm	—N/a
"T.Y.B.G."	2019	TommyxBoi	Better Off Dead
"Dudes"	2019	Waddie Lee	—N/a
"Bounce"	2019	Chris Gwappin	—N/a
"P.S.118 (Reprise)"	2019	Vinyl Spectrum	—N/a
"Sauce"	2019	Bknott	—N/a
"Chinese Food"	2019	Dreyy2x	—N/a
"Mindcraft Based Freestyle"	2019	Keyboard Kid	Mindcraft
"In the Field Again (Remix)"	2019	Fortyten	—N/a
"Hoopla! (Remix)"	2019	BernardRaps	—N/a
"Hatchets"	2019	Marmormaze	—N/a
"SBC Fusion"	2019	Tonzo', Spaghking	—N/a
"Top Down (Remix)"	2019	Jon Fifer	—N/a
"BB"	2019	Screwed City	—N/a
"What I've Been Through"	2019	S'morez	—N/a
"Juvenile Hell (The BasedGod Speaks)"	2019	Big Baby Scumbag, Lex Luger	Juvenile Hell
"BandsTalk"	2019	Zola182	—N/a
"Idol"	2019	Leon Vegas	—N/a
"Whole Lot"	2019	Gino Marley	Raised in The Streets 2
"Kokkaan"	2019	Germiili	—N/a
"Hit Block"	2019	Gardouja	—N/a
"I Would Never"	2019	Earl Dawgit	Dawgit County, Vol. 1
"Cargo Kult"	2019	Young Boy Critical	—N/a
"Just Do It"	2019	GRIMM Doza	—N/a
"Moon Boi"	2019	Nahhdahh	—N/a
"Lighthouse (Remix)"	2019	Ezza of Chroom Gang, Motëm	—N/a
"Spiderman"	2019	DLNQNT, So Loki	—N/a
"Hot Mess"	2019	Simo Soo	Pink Metal
"The Recipe"	2019	Jig Papi Rome	Life of the Party
"Big Belts Texas (Remix)"	2019	BBY KODIE	Vogue
"Goin' Rogue"	2019	Cray	Morella Part III: I Am Here!
"Cartoon NetWorth (Remix)"	2019	Mike Fulahope	—N/a
"Nigga Wan Rob"	2019	Kenny Mill$	—N/a
"Tea!"	2019	Lil Sammy Junior	Long Awaited
"Brand New Jesus"	2019	Jarvis Waterfall	—N/a
"Based God's Intro"	2019	Curtis Williams	i have so much to tell you
"40 Pizzas"	2019	Lil Rainbo, Fried Arizona	—N/a
"Bring It Back (Remix)"	2019	Luda The Fiend	—N/a
"Been Thru"	2019	DamesNotDead, NAFortNight	—N/a
"Man of God"	2019	Kid-Naps	Man of God
"Friendship"	2019	Apoc Krysis	—N/a
"Elegance"	2019	Young Jame	—N/a
"We From the Bay"	2019	Yasin	—N/a
"Based on a True Story"	2019	Chris Falcon	—N/a
"No Native Person Is Ugly"	2019	Talon The Rez Kid Wonder	—N/a
"Super Based Bros"	2019	Berioso, Yung Nesse	Most Potent Dope
"Really Matters"	2019	Johnnny, Hydn Prblms	—N/a
"Improve on Ya"	2019	Asendo, AnTone, Mayo Staccato	—N/a
"Smoking & Driving"	2019	Thehomiecee	—N/a
"A Based Christmas Carol"	2019	G-SCO	—N/a
"Weather"	2020	Jetpack Brandon, Will White	Neon Burger
"Too Many Times"	2020	Laura Peñate	—N/a
"Shaking Handzzz"	2020	Betty	—N/a
"Don't Think"	2020	Enjetic, Chris Hamilton	—N/a
"Fair Chance"	2020	Thundercat, Ty Dolla $ign	It Is What It Is
"Lock the Gate"	2020	Blind Tiger	Lock the Gate
"Телефон"	2020	Flesh	Cosmopolitrap
"More B*tches Than The Mayor"	2021	ILoveMakonnen	My Parade
"FEP SHAWTY"	2021	Rob Frost, Slimmuddy	N/A
"Collaborating"	2021	Xaviersobased	N/A
"Stupid"	2021	Just Friends	Hella
"Basic"	2022	Just Friends, Hobo Johnson	Hella
"Therapy"	2022	Save Ferris	N/A
"Swag Like Ohio Pt. 2"	2023	Trippie Redd	Mansion Musik
"First Night"	2024	Lyrical Lemonade, Teezo Touchdown, Juicy J, Cochise, Denzel Curry	All Is Yellow
"God's Not American"	2024	Acid Ghost	
"Dadz Love"	2025	Justin Bieber	Swag
"Safe Space"	2025	Justin Bieber	Swag II
