= Clams Casino production discography =

The following list is a discography of production by Clams Casino, an American record producer. It includes a list of songs produced and co-produced by year, artist, album and title.

== 2008 ==
=== Sha Stimuli – The Wire ===
- 1. "Intro/23 Dollars"

=== Sha Stimuli – Love Jones ===
- 16. "I Tried" (featuring Sala)

=== Sha Stimuli – March on Washington ===
- 10. "Say Something"

=== Sha Stimuli – The Secret ===
- 2. "Weight of the World"

=== Sha Stimuli – Hotter Than July (A Tribute to Stevie Wonder) ===
- 02. "So Many (Tight Ones pt 2)"
- 03. "Coldness"
- 04. "Redemption"
- 07. "The Flows (Freestyle)"
- 08. "Overjoyed"
- 10. "These 3 Words"
- 11. "You Will Know"
- 12. "Knocks Me Off My Feet"
- 15. "I Get Up"

=== Sha Stimuli – March on Washington (Election Edition) ===
- 03. "Say Something Remix" (featuring Mickey Factz)
- 12. "March on Washington"

== 2009 ==
=== Deezy D and Squadda B – North Pole Movement ===
- 06. "Get Em"
- 22. "New York Swag" (featuring Da Ref)
- 23. "Digital Radio" (featuring Liddle)

=== Havoc – From Now On ===
- 06. "Always Have a Choice"

=== Omar 10.0 and Fetty Slaps – Yo Mommas Favorite Mixtape! Vol.1 ===
- 3. "Oh My God!" (featuring Phunky Brewster)

=== Shady Blaze – Shady Blaze Mixtape #1 ===
- 6. "King of the Jungle (S.H.A.D.Y)"

=== Deezy D – Get Em' Deezy ===
- 04. "Street Banger" (featuring Squadda B)
- 05. "Deezy Fuckin D"
- 06. "Get Dough"
- 11. "Champion"
- 12. "Bake Me a Cake" (featuring Tam Kidd)
- 14. "100 Thousand" (featuring Gaitta, Squadda B and Lil B)
- 15. "I Want You" (featuring Mikelle)
- 16. "Fallin Fallin"
- 17. "Dripped All Starz"

=== Main Attrakionz – Main Attrakionz Hip Hop ===
- 2. "I'm Official" (performed by Squadda B)

=== Lil B – 6 Kiss ===
- 02. "I'm God"
- 16. "I'm the Devil"
- 17. "What You Doin'"

=== Young Boi – Mouth Game Sick: The Mixtape ===
- 13. "Your Young Boi"

== 2010 ==
=== Dash – The Script to My Instrumental ===
- 6. "Not the Same" (featuring Neako)

=== Deezy D – For tha Love of Deezy ===
- 7. "She's Hot"

=== Main Attrakionz – 808s & Dark Grapes ===
- 05. "Kush Tonight" (performed by Deezy D featuring Squadda B)
- 11. "Shining Everytime"

=== Lil B ===
- "Realist Alive"

=== Squadda B – 63 Mainey ===
- 02. "Ask Yourself"

=== Lil B – Blue Flame ===
- 04. "Cold War"

=== Main Attrakionz – Blood Money (Collector's Item) ===
- 09. "Bonus Track"

=== E da Ref – Weapons of Mass Destruction, Vol.1 ===
- 2. "War"

== 2011 ==
=== G-Side – The One...Cohesive ===
- 9. "Pictures" (featuring G-Mane) (co-produced by Str8 Drop, A-Team, Basmo, and Open Team Music Group)

=== Lil B – Angels Exodus ===
- 05. "Motivation"

=== Squadda B – I Smoke Because I Don't Care About Death ===
- 07. "Fakest Year Ever"
- 13. "Kissin' on My Syrup" (produced with D/R Period and Nem270)

=== The Jealous Guys – The Love Mixtape ===
- 14. "Brainwash by London"

=== Lil B – Red Flame: Devil Music Edition ===
- 04. "Illusions of Grandeur"

=== Lil B – Illusions of Grandeur ===
- 2. "Live from da Hood"

=== Soulja Boy – 1UP ===
- 13. "I Love My Fans"
- 14. "I Love My Haters"

=== Shady Blaze – Rappers Ain't $#!% Without a Producer ===
- 15. "Haters Opinion"

=== Lil B – I'm Gay (I'm Happy) ===
- 04. "Unchain Me"
- 12. "1 Time Remix"

=== Main Attrakionz – 808s & Dark Grapes II ===
- 09. "Take 1" (featuring ASAP Rocky)

=== Adult Swim Music – Adult Swim Singles Program 2011 ===
- 08. "Wizard" (performed by Clams Casino)

=== Mac Miller – I Love Life, Thank You ===
- 07. "Cold Feet"

=== ASAP Rocky – Live. Love. ASAP ===
- 01. "Palace"
- 03. "Bass"
- 04. "Wassup"
- 13. "Leaf" (featuring Main Attrakionz)
- 15. "Demons"

=== Mac Miller – Blue Slide Park ===
- 09. "My Team"
- 16. "One Last Thing"

=== The Weeknd – Echoes of Silence ===
- 07. "The Fall" (produced with Illangelo)

== 2012 ==
=== Lil B – God's Father ===
- 28. "Turned Me Cold"

=== Mac Miller – Macadelic ===
- 13. "Angels (When She Shuts Her Eyes)"

=== Robb Banks – Calendars ===
- 04. "Counting (March)"
- 07. "Finest (June)"

=== Lil B – Green Flame ===
- 19. "Back Home"

=== JJ Doom – Key to the Kuffs ===
- 22. "Bookfiend (Clams Casino Version)"

=== ASAP Mob – Lords Never Worry ===
- 13. "Freeze" (featuring ASAP Rocky and Jim Jones)

=== Squadda B – My Room Look Like a Mall ===
- 11. "Squadda x Clams Casino x Floyd Waybetter"

== 2013 ==
=== ASAP Rocky – Long. Live. ASAP ===
- 04. "LVL"
- 05. "Hell" (featuring Santigold)

=== Mac Miller – Watching Movies with the Sound Off ===
- 05. "Bird Call"
- 16. "Youforia"

=== Lucki – Alternative Trap ===
- 08. "Cocaine Woman"

== 2014 ==
=== Schoolboy Q – Oxymoron ===
- 16. "Gravy"

=== Lee "Scratch" Perry ===
- "Jesus Is a Soul Man"

=== Jhené Aiko – Souled Out ===
- 02. "W.A.Y.S." (produced with Fisticuffs and Thundercat)

=== ASAP Ferg – Ferg Forever ===
- 05. "Uncle"
- 19. "Talk It"

=== XXXTentacion ===
- "3 AM Freestyle" (produced with XXXTentacion)

== 2015 ==
=== Mikky Ekko – Time ===
- 09. "Comatose" (produced with Justin Parker and Mikky Ekko)
- 10. "Pull Me Down" (produced with Mikky Ekko)

=== Vince Staples – Summertime '06 ===
- 03. "Norf Norf"
- 10. "Summertime"
- 13. "Surf" (featuring Kilo Kish)

== 2016 ==
=== ASAP Ferg – Always Strive and Prosper ===
(All tracks produced with DJ Khalil)

- 01. "Rebirth"
- 05. "Psycho"
- 11. "Beautiful People" (featuring Chuck D and Mama Ferg)

=== Various artists – #Savefabric ===
- 18. "Time" (performed by Clams Casino)

== 2017 ==
=== Lucki – Watch My Back ===
- 7. "Leave wit You"

== 2018 ==
=== Lil Peep ===
- "4 Gold Chains" (featuring Clams Casino)

=== Elle Watson – Clinchers ===
- 04. “Glued”

=== ASAP Rocky – Testing ===
- 14. "Black Tux, White Collar" (produced with Tank God, Hector Delgado, Lord Flacko, and Kelvin Krash)

=== serpentwithfeet – soil ===
- 02. "messy" (produced with Serpentwithfeet)
- 04. "fragrant" (produced with Serpentwithfeet)
- 05. "mourning song" (produced with Serpentwithfeet and Katie Gately)
- 07. "seedless" (produced with Serpentwithfeet)

=== Joji – Ballads 1 ===
- 05. "Can't Get Over You" (featuring Clams Casino) (produced with Thundercat and Rogét Chahayed)

== 2019 ==
=== Jacques Greene – Dawn Chorus ===
- 02. "Drop Location" (produced with Jacques Greene)

== 2020 ==
=== Joji – Nectar ===
- 10. "Nitrous" (produced with Rogét Chahayed)

=== Deftones – Black Stallion ===
- 01. "Feiticeira (Clams Casino Remix)"

== 2021 ==
=== ASAP Rocky – Live. Love. ASAP (Re-release) ===
- 15. "Sandman" (produced with Kelvin Krash)

== 2022 ==
=== Flume – Palaces ===
- 12. "Go" (produced with Flume)
- 13. "Palaces" (featuring Damon Albarn) (produced with Flume)

=== Earl Sweatshirt ===
- "Making The Band" (produced with Evilgiane)

=== J-Hope – Jack in the Box ===
- 04. "Stop"
- 10. "Arson"

== 2023 ==
=== Untiljapan – Safe Travels ===
- 9. "Kiss n Tell"

=== The Kid Laroi – The First Time ===
- 8. "Nights Like This"

== 2024 ==
=== Kid Cudi – Insano ===
- 16. "Seven" (with Lil Wayne) (produced with Take a Daytrip)

=== The Kid Laroi – The First Time (Deluxe Version) ===
- 4. "Nights Like This Pt.2"

=== Montell Fish – Charlotte ===
- 6. "Is It a Crime?" (produced with Montell Fish and Jacob Portrait)

=== 1oneam – One Death ===
- 7. "Top Dog"

== 2025 ==
=== The Kid Laroi ===
- "All I Want Is You"

=== Eem Triplin – Melody of a Memory ===
- 11. "Tall Tales" (produced with WonderGurl, Dahi and Dilip)

=== Mike and Tony Seltzer – Pinball II ===
- 9. "Prezzy" (produced with Tony Seltzer)

=== Lil Tecca – Dopamine ===
- 13. "One Night" (produced with Ginseng)

== 2026 ==
=== Lerado Khalil – Black Flag ===
- 6. "Bridge the Gap" (featuring Clams Casino and Nedarb) (produced with Nedarb)
