= Black Ken =

2017 mixtape by Lil B

Mixtape by Lil B
- Released: August 17, 2017
- Genres: Hip-hop; hyphy; G-funk; deep funk; electro-funk
- Length: 99:14
- Label: BasedWorld
- Producer: The BasedGod

Lil B chronology
Thugged Out Pissed Off (2015)	Black Ken (2017)	Platinum Flame (2018)

Black Ken is a mixtape by American rapper Lil B. It was self-released on August 17, 2017. Black Ken was self-produced by Lil B, and was dedicated to Diddy, Lil Yachty, and Lil Uzi Vert. It was first announced in 2010, with the release of singles and a 26-track preview to DatPiff.

In November 2016, Lil B tweeted that he was listening to songs from Black Ken, adding that it would be released in the coming months. Martin Shkreli, who had purchased Wu-Tang Clan's album Once Upon a Time in Shaolin (2015), expressed interest in purchasing the mixtape, and received a positive response from Lil B. The next month, Lil B released the song "My House" in collaboration with producer Metro Boomin as a single for Black Ken, though it was not featured on the mixtape.

Critics highlighted Lil B's stylistic versatility throughout the mixtape, and considered the production and rapping performances an improvement over his previous work. Black Ken is a hip-hop mixtape, with elements of hyphy and funk. Critics also noted that the mixtape features 1980s West Coast hip-hop influences, with Francis Gooding of The Wire writing that Black Ken "orbits around [Lil B's] hometown of Berkeley". Black Ken consists of 27 tracks and one feature from rapper ILoveMakonnen.

== Background and release ==
Lil B first announced Black Ken in April 2010. In the following months, he released singles from the mixtape as well as a 26-track preview to DatPiff. The preview was released alongside cover art illustrated by graphic artist Benjamin Marra, who also created the cover for Lil B's 2009 mixtape 6 Kiss. Although Black Ken did not see an official release following the preview, Lil B continued to hint at one in the following years.

Lil B THE BASEDGOD
(@LILBTHEBASEDGOD)
tweeted:

lil b fina change the world wow I been crying listening to new songs from Lil B unreleased extremely rare art black Ken mixtape - Lil B

November 24, 2016

On November 24, 2016, Lil B tweeted that he cried while listening to songs from Black Ken. He also said that the mixtape would be released "this month or next month", adding that it was a tribute to Kanye West. Pharmaceutical executive Martin Shkreli, who had purchased hip-hop group Wu-Tang Clan's album Once Upon a Time in Shaolin (2015) for US$2 million, responded to Lil B's tweets in support, asking where he could purchase Black Ken. Lil B replied positively, saying he would be in contact.

The next month, on December 20, Lil B announced that Black Ken was "coming soon" and that it was dedicated to Diddy, who had previously brought out Lil B at a Bay Area show. He also later dedicated the mixtape to hip-hop artists Iggy Azalea, Vince Staples, Lil Yachty, Lil Uzi Vert, Nas, French Montana, Jadakiss, The Lox, and "the east coast as a whole". A week later, Lil B released the track "My House" as a single for Black Ken. The track, which had been first previewed by Lil B at Rolling Loud in May, was premiered via WorldStarHipHop. "My House" was produced by Metro Boomin and samples "Tha Crossroads" (1996) by hip-hop group Bone Thugs-n-Harmony.

In February 2017, Lil B announced that he had finished Black Ken and in May, stated that it was "100% complete". He also described it as his "first official mixtape", telling XXL magazine: "Right now this is the most proud of any project that I have done ... This is hip-hop at its purest form." On August 2, Lil B announced that Black Ken would be released on August 17, and shared seven songs from the mixtape. He also shared the mixtape's 27-song track list, which did not include "My House".

On August 16, 2017, a day before the planned release of Black Ken, the mixtape was leaked to Lil B's DatPiff account. In a tweet, Lil B stated that he was locked out of his DatPiff account following the unauthorized release. The release was later taken down from the website. A day later, on Lil B's 28th birthday, the mixtape was officially self-released via BasedWorld. It is his 51st mixtape, and unlike most of Lil B's previous work, it was not distributed as a free download. Initially, Black Ken was released to SoundCloud and iTunes, before being added to other streaming services such as Spotify a year later.

== Composition ==
Black Ken was fully produced by Lil B under his BasedGod alias. He worked with four engineers and used a Casio keyboard to produce the beats on the mixtape. Black Ken has a runtime of an hour and 39 minutes and consists of 27 tracks. It contains no guest appearances other than rapper ILoveMakonnen on the song "Global". Black Ken is a hip-hop, hyphy, G-funk, deep funk, and electro-funk mixtape with elements of 1980s Bay Area rap. Critics highlighted Lil B's stylistic versatility, and considered his rapping and sound on the mixtape more refined than on previous releases. HotNewHipHop's Alphonse Pierre described Black Ken as "the first Lil B mixtape where everything felt premeditated", and named it Lil B's most ambitious project.

Writing for Pitchfork, Meaghan Garvey said that the first eight tracks "represent [Lil B's] most purposeful block of music since his 2009 opus 6 Kiss". Tiny Mix Tapes called Black Ken Lil B's most divisive and most accessible mixtape to date. Ross Scarano of Complex described the beats on the mixtape as "retro but not quite," while Angel Diaz called the production "crisp and polished". John Twells of Fact wrote that the mixtape lacked Lil B's usual cloud rap sound. Pitchfork's Evan Minsker called Black Ken "a defining statement throughout." Francis Gooding of The Wire wrote that the mixtape "orbits around [Lil B's] hometown of Berkeley", and described it as "a tribute record to the rap music that made him a rapper".

=== Tracks ===
"Still Run It", the second track of the mixtape, was described as a "West Coast anthem" by HotNewHipHop's Mitch Findlay. Meaghan Garvey of Pitchfork compared Lil B's flow on the track to that of Tupac Shakur. The next track, "Bad MF", features a piano beat, and was described as "the ultimate kiss-off anthem" by Minsker. "Hip Hop", a boom bap-inspired track, contains a "Hip! Hop! Hip! Hop!" chorus. The eighth track, "Free Life", was highlighted by critics, and features "tight, spaced-out production," according to Tiny Mix Tapes. Pitchfork's Sheldon Pearce described the song as "an oddball motivational speech", and compared it to Lil B's "No Black Person Is Ugly" (2014).

"Young Niggaz", the tenth track, was later remixed with a verse from rapper YG. The next song, "Getting Hot", was described as a "club banger" by Tiny Mix Tapes. Lil B's flow and voice on the track were compared to that of rapper Keak Da Sneak. "Go Stupid Go Dumb", the twelfth track, was described as "a hyphy tribute" by Gooding. The thirteenth track, "Global", features Black Ken's only guest appearance, by rapper ILoveMakonnen. In a HotNewHipHop review of the song, Trevor Smith wrote that it sees "Lil B and Makonnen's worlds collide in a highly complimentary [sic] way", and compared the production on the track to Diddy's 2010 album, Last Train To Paris. Pitchfork's Jayson Greene considered "Global" a highlight from Black Ken, calling it "the most unlikely club banger of [Lil B and ILoveMakonnen's] careers."

"Zam Bose (In San Jose)"
In her Pitchfork review of Black Ken, Meaghan Garvey wrote that "Zam Bose (In San Jose)" "resists explanation entirely."

The fourteenth track, "Ride (Hold Up)", was described as a "sonic outlier" and "a Clara Rockmore theremin performance interrupted by sepia-toned zaps of Detroit techno" by Garvey. "Zam Bose (In San Jose)", the sixteenth track, contains elements of Latin music, and was described as one of Black Ken's "brutal lows" by Pierre. Garvey wrote that the song "resists explanation entirely." Findlay compared the following track, "Go Senorita Go", to Lil B's 2010 song, "Hipster Girls". Garvey compared Lil B's voice on the eighteenth track, "Turn Up (Till You Can’t)", to his voice on his 2012 song, "California Boy". The song was also called a "club banger" by Tiny Mix Tapes. The twenty-second track, "The Real Is Back", saw Lil B "airing out his beef with Soulja Boy", according to Minsker.

== Critical reception ==
Professional ratings
Review scores
Source	Rating
Pitchfork	8.5/10
Tiny Mix Tapes	2.5/5 stars

In a Pitchfork review, Meaghan Garvey described Black Ken as Lil B's masterpiece. The publication also named it the tenth-best rap release and 43rd-best album of 2017. Fact included it on its list of 25 best albums between July and September 2017, with John Twells calling it Lil B's most coherent and enjoyable release since God's Father (2012).

Black Ken was included on The Wire's top 50 releases of 2017, with the publication calling it "a more considered and structured statement than B has produced for a long while." Complex named Black Ken the 50th-best album of 2017, with Angel Diaz writing that Lil B has "never sounded better". HipHopDX included Black Ken on its "Best Mixtapes & EPs Of 2017" list.

Tiny Mix Tapes included the mixtape on their "Favorite Rap Mixtapes of August 2017" list, describing it as "an amalgamation of [Lil B's] past and a sampling of a possible future". In the publication's review of Black Ken, Corrigan B described it as "Lil B’s first capitulation to convention in a decade." He also commented that musically, "there’s no angle by which it stands out within Lil B’s discography", and stated that the mixtape's adherence to convention detracted from its quality.

== Track listing ==
All tracks are written and produced by Brandon McCartney.

Black Ken track listing
No.	Title	Length
1.	"Produced by the BasedGod Intro"	2:53
2.	"Still Run It"	3:33
3.	"Bad MF"	3:40
4.	"Wasup JoJo"	3:05
5.	"Hip Hop"	2:58
6.	"DJ BasedGod"	6:52
7.	"Berkeley"	5:09
8.	"Free Life"	5:09
9.	"Pretty Boy Skit"	0:38
10.	"Young Niggaz"	3:30
11.	"Getting Hot"	3:42
12.	"Go Stupid Go Dumb"	3:46
13.	"Global" (featuring ILoveMakonnen)	5:20
14.	"Ride (Hold Up)"	3:20
15.	"Mexico Skit"	0:45
16.	"Zam Bose (In San Jose)"	3:24
17.	"Go Senorita Go"	3:52
18.	"Turn Up (Till You Can't)"	3:31
19.	"Ain't Me"	3:18
20.	"Raw"	5:27
21.	"West Coast"	4:16
22.	"The Real Is Back"	4:26
23.	"Rawest Rapper Alive"	4:55
24.	"Da Backstreetz"	4:08
25.	"Rare Art"	4:18
26.	"Show Promoter Skit"	0:26
27.	"Live From the Island - Hawaii"	2:53
Total length:		99:14
