= Afrikantis =

Studio album by Lil B
- Released: December 22, 2022
- Genre: Jazz
- Length: 1:11:18
- Label: Basedworld
- Producer: Lil B

Lil B chronology
Call of Duty Task Force (2022)	Afrikantis (2022)	Bitch Mob Tha Album (2023)

Afrikantis is the third instrumental album by the American rapper Lil B, released through Basedworld on December 22, 2022. A jazz album, it marks a stylistic departure for Lil B, who would usually release hip hop mixtapes. He had experimented with production in the past; he released the instrumental albums Choices and Flowers and Tears 4 God in 2012, and self-produced some of his later mixtapes. Compared to the lo-fi and ambient production of his previous instrumental releases, Afrikantis is less connected to musical concepts such as melody and harmony. The album was received poorly by critics, who mainly criticized its discordant instrumentation.

== Background and release ==
Since embarking on his solo career in 2008, Lil B frequently released hip hop mixtapes. In 2012, he released the instrumental albums Choices and Flowers and Tears 4 God, which both featured lo-fi and ambient production. In the following years, Lil B continued to experiment with production—his mixtapes Black Ken (2017) and Platinum Flame (2018) were entirely self-produced. The year 2022 was a relatively slow period for Lil B, with the release of Frozen and The Frozen Tape in June, followed by Thraxxx Kiss in July. Without prior announcement, he released Afrikantis on December 22, 2022, via Basedworld.

== Composition ==
Afrikantis is an instrumental jazz (Note: Attributed to HipHopDX, HotNewHipHop, and Hypebeast.) album with elements of avant-garde and electro jazz. It was entirely produced, mixed, and engineered by Lil B, and is a departure from his usual hip hop sound. The album consists of 14 tracks, and has a runtime of 72 minutes. Compared to Lil B's previous instrumental releases, Afrikantis is less connected to musical concepts such as melody and harmony. Critics compared the album's sound to On the Corner (1972) by Miles Davis, Head Hunters (1973) by Herbie Hancock, and the "orchestral vaporwave purveyed by James Ferraro and Orange Milk Records".

"My Fathers Drums"
"My Fathers Drums", the opening track of the album, incorporates dissonant trumpets and cymbal crashes.

The opening tracks, "My Fathers Drums" and "A Song for Mom" feature dissonant trumpets and cymbal crashes. The following song, "Cricket", contains panpipe synthesizers, and was described by Pitchfork's Sam Goldner as "the most dialed-in of the bunch". "Kim" opens with beating bongos, and features rhythms reminiscent of world music. In the middle of the song, increasingly discordant synthesized samples are layered on top of each other. "Albany Middle" is followed by "Solano Stroll", which rides a guitar riff that Goldner described as "strange" and "slanted". A staff member from Sputnikmusic wrote that the song "Del the Funky Homosapien" sounded like it could be used as a backing track for its namesake, an American rapper. Steve "Flash" Juon of RapReviews wrote that the song "Guinea Pig Arcade" is a mix of bass guitar slaps, "a banjo picking jamboree", and "randomly chosen notes from the high end of a synthesizer". The last four tracks are named after locations in California—Lil B's home state—and feature instrumentals which have a more hip-hop-like sound. Goldner described "Welcome to Oakland California", the penultimate song, as "a cacophony of car alarms, shattering glass, and police sirens".

== Critical reception ==
Professional ratings
Review scores
Source	Rating
Pitchfork	5.3/10
RapReviews	2/10
Sputnikmusic	2.5/5

Afrikantis was received poorly by critics. While some praised the album for its originality, it was widely criticized for its clashing and "cheap" production. Juon described Afrikantis as "the audio version of the infinite monkey theorem", and felt it highlighted Lil B's weak production skills. He named "Eurasia" one of the most "listenable" tracks on the album, but still criticized the song for trying to mix styles "that don't really fit together". Goldner called Afrikantis an "ocean of hopelessly annoying slop" and criticized its instrumentation, saying it was "seemingly recorded with the cheapest MIDI presets on the market". A Sputnikmusic staff member wrote "I’m most likely never going to listen to Afrikantis again", but commended the album's humor and novelty.

== Track listing ==
All music is composed by Lil B and The BasedGod.

Afrikantis track listing
No.	Title	Length
1.	"My Fathers Drums"	4:24
2.	"A Song for Mom"	8:28
3.	"Cricket"	6:50
4.	"Kim"	5:08
5.	"Albany Middle"	4:07
6.	"Solano Stroll"	4:00
7.	"Berkeley California"	3:16
8.	"Eurasia"	5:28
9.	"Del the Funky Homosapien"	5:20
10.	"Guinea Pig Arcade"	2:41
11.	"Jack London Square Oakland Ca"	6:43
12.	"West Berkeley Ca Waterfront"	5:08
13.	"Welcome to Oakland California"	7:04
14.	"Park St Alameda Californina"	2:41
Total length:		1:11:18
