= Based =

Internet slang term

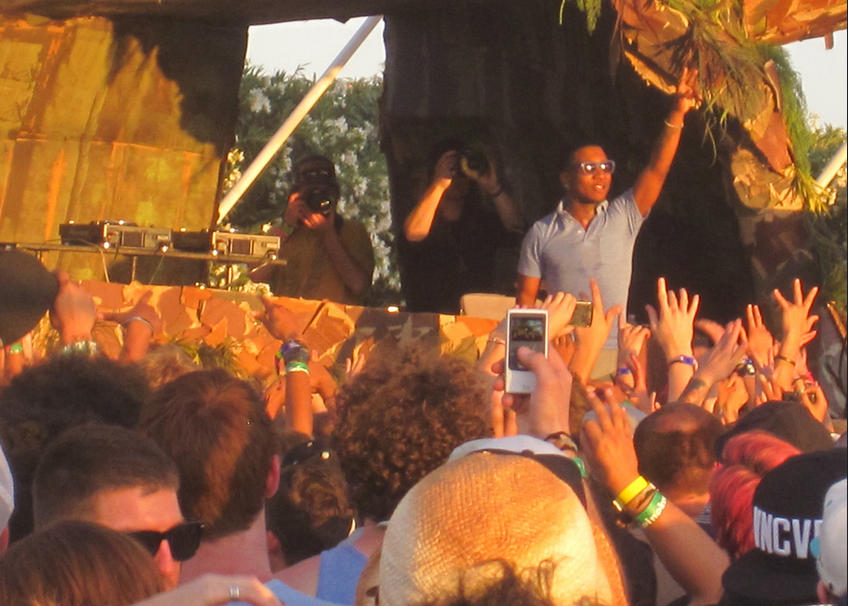
Lil B at Coachella music festival in 2011

Based is a slang term that originally emerged in California during the 1970s, stemming from the phrase "freebase cocaine," a method which makes the drug smokable. "Based" was derived from "basehead," a term used to refer to a freebase addict. The term grew in prominence as a pejorative during the crack epidemic to refer to someone who was "cracked out". By the late 2000s and early 2010s, it became an Internet slang term as popularized by American rapper Lil B, also known as Lil B the BasedGod. He appropriated the phrase as a reclaimed word, which he defined as being yourself and positive.

During the early-to mid 2010s, the term was adopted by online members of the Gamergate campaign to refer to conservative critic Christina Hoff Sommers as "Based Mom". The phrase was later reappropriated by Trump supporters and evolved to describe an agreement with unpopular opinions or stances and actions that negate political correctness. By 2023, the FBI deemed the phrase "based and redpilled" as connected to alt-right extremism online.

== Etymology ==
=== Origins ===
According to The Spectator, the term emerged as a phrase in California during the 1970s, stemming from the term "freebase cocaine," a method which makes the drug smokable. "Based" was derived from "basehead," a term used to refer to a freebase addict. The term grew in prominence as a pejorative during the crack epidemic to refer to someone who was "cracked out". During the mid-to late 2000s, Lil B, reappropriated the pejorative as a term of endearment, using it to describe a positive and bold lifestyle. The phrase had been used by him as early as 2007 on several song and album titles. He adopted the nickname "The Based God" with music critics referring to his rapping style as "based". According to Lil B, "Based" is a reclaimed word:

Based means being yourself. Not being scared of what people think about you. Not being afraid to do what you wanna do. Being positive. When I was younger, based was a negative term that meant like dopehead, or basehead. People used to make fun of me. They was like, "You're based." They'd use it as a negative. And what I did was turn that negative into a positive. I started embracing it like, "Yeah, I'm based." I made it mine. I embedded it in my head. Based is positive.

=== Semantic change ===
According to Slate magazine, the phrase was co-opted by misogynists in 2014 during the Gamergate campaign to refer to conservative critic Christina Hoff Sommers as "Based Mom". By the late 2010s, the phrase had been used to describe stances or actions that negate political correctness. The term continued to be co-opted by edgelord culture, white nationalists, and the alt-right.

In 2016, Slate magazine stated that the term "based" had been reappropriated by "racist Trump supporters". By 2023, Dazed magazine stated that the FBI had deemed the term "based and redpilled" as connected to violent alt-right extremism online. The article stated that, according to the FBI, using the term "based" might lead to an individual being labeled an "incel extremist". It also criticized the FBI's stance, arguing that the Internet was "steeped in irony and political satire."

"Based" as a slang term was later reclaimed again by Gen Z artists inspired by Lil B such as Xaviersobased and his collective 1c34, and had also entered the mainstream, regaining a neutral connotation.

== In popular culture ==
The term has been used by the White House's X account under the Second Trump Administration.

In 2026, The New York Times were criticized for not crediting Lil B for the origins of "based" as a slang term.

== See also ==
- Generation Z slang
- Hot take
