= Fake Love =

Fake Love may refer to:

- "Fake Love" (Drake song), 2016
- "Fake Love" (BTS song), 2018
- "Fake Love", a song by Doda from Aquaria, 2022
- "Fake Love", a song by Lil B from the mixtape Obama BasedGod, 2012
- "Fake Love (Yes Men)", a song by Statik Selektah from the album 100 Proof: The Hangover, 2010
- "Nanchatte Ren'ai" (transl. "Fake Love"), a 2009 song by Morning Musume
- "Fake Love", a song by Guru Randhawa from Man of the Moon, 2022
- "偽物 (FAKE LOVE)", a song by the South Korean group WEI from Wave (WEi EP), 2024

== See also ==
- "Faking Love", a 1982 song by T. G. Sheppard and Karen Brooks
- "Fake Love Don't Last", a 2022 song by Machine Gun Kelly from Mainstream Sellout
