= Obama BasedGod =

Mixtape by Lil B
- Released: July 30, 2012
- Genre: Hip-hop • Political hip-hop
- Length: 55:49
- Label: BasedWorld
- Producer: Base Beatz; DJ Troublesome; Dominic Angelella; The-Dream; GeneralBeatZ; iNFallibleMusic; Kanye West; LV; Poke of Trackmasters; Sarafis Midas; Scientific Beats; Sean Combs

Lil B chronology
Task Force (2012)	Obama BasedGod (2012)	Based Jam (2012)

Obama BasedGod is a mixtape by American rapper Lil B. It was released digitally for free on July 30, 2012 through Lil B's own record label, BasedWorld Records.

The mixtape references Barack Obama, the first African-American President of the United States and features tracks that focus politics and societal issues.

== Music ==
Obama Basedgod is described as Lil B's "most straightforward rap-rap" release since 2011's I'm Gay (I'm Happy)." On the mixtape's production, Lil B stokes "nostalgia for the Diplomats' or Hov's heyday with sped-up soul and Motown singles throughout." The track "Government Imported" features the beat from Jay-Z's "This Can't Be Life". The track "Vote for Lil B" is the most political song on the mixtape, while the track "Freeway Trips" is about his financial troubles.

== Critical reception ==
Professional ratings
Review scores
Source	Rating
Pitchfork	5.5/10

Carrie Battan of Pitchfork was mixed in her review of the mixtape, stating: "Despite its charms, Obama Basedgod is often downright boring, joyless, and indistinguishable from hours upon hours of the rapper's throwaway material." Battan also wrote: "Obama Basedgod is ultimately an insignificant piece to the Lil B puzzle, but that's the point-- without the excess, the dependable comforts of the curious hum of his machine would fade to black."

== Track listing ==
All tracks are written by Brandon McCartney.

No.	Title	Producer(s)	Length
1.	"Obama BasedGod"	Sarafis Midas	3:11
2.	"Political Warfare"	The-Dream	3:59
3.	"Vote for Lil B"		2:49
4.	"United States of Thuggin"		4:05
5.	"Constant War"		3:38
6.	"Freeway Trips"	GeneralBeatZ	3:24
7.	"Government Imported"	Kanye West	2:31
8.	"Fake Love"	Base Beatz	3:37
9.	"Put Down the Flags"		3:30
10.	"White House"	Dominic Angelella	3:01
11.	"The Cabinet"	DJ Troublesome	4:02
12.	"Oakland Tech"	Base Beatz	2:39
13.	"Based Party"	Sean Combs; LV	3:31
14.	"Election Day"	iNFallibleMusic	3:11
15.	"Too Real 4 the World"		2:04
16.	"2 Time President"	Scientific Beats	3:10
17.	"I Don't Want Shit (Remix)"	Poke of Trackmasters; Combs	3:47
Total length:			55:49

Sample credits

- "Obama BasedGod" contains a sample from One Got Fat.
- "Political Warfare" samples Pusha T's "Exodus 23:1", which features The-Dream.
- "Freeway Trips" contains a sample from Gwen McCrae's "Love Without Sex".
- "Government Imported" samples Jay-Z's "This Can't Be Life".
- "Fake Love" contains a sample from Labelle's "Isn't It a Shame?".
- "Put Down the Flags" contains samples from Cortex's "Troupeau Bleu".
- "Oakland Tech" contains a sample from Marvin Gaye's "Let's Get It On".
- "Based Party" samples Jay-Z's "Roc Boys (And the Winner Is)...".
- "Too Real 4 the World" contains a sample from Fed-X's "Front of My Jects".
- "I Don't Want Shit (Remix)" samples The Notorious B.I.G.'s "Juicy".
