= Thugged Out Pissed Off =

Mixtape by Lil B
- Released: December 30, 2015
- Genre: Hip-hop
- Length: 3:50:29
- Label: Self-released

Lil B chronology
Free (Based Freestyles Mixtape) (2015)	Thugged Out Pissed Off (2015)	Black Ken (2017)

Singles from Thugged Out Pissed Off
- 1. "Soul Food" Released: May 31, 2015; 2. "4 Tha Record" Released: November 1, 2015; 3. "Flexin Maury Povich" Released: November 5, 2015; 4. "BasedGod ("Jumpman Remix")" Released: December 28, 2015

Thugged Out Pissed Off is a mixtape by the American rapper Lil B, self-released on December 30, 2015. Compared to Lil B's previous releases, it features darker production and subject matter. The mixtape's lyrics, which were inspired by hardships Lil B faced throughout 2015, mainly center around themes of poverty and crime. Thugged Out Pissed Off consists of 63 tracks, and has a runtime of nearly 4 hours. It is a hip-hop mixtape.

Leading up to the mixtape's release, Lil B's musical output diminished significantly. In interviews, he attributed his inactivity to his focus on his personal life. He also said that he was adopting a more deliberate songwriting process compared to the freestyles which dominated his earlier work. Lil B released five singles for Thugged Out Pissed Off, all of which received accompanying music videos. One of the singles released was "4 Tha Record", a diss track directed at Canadian singer The Weeknd.

== Background ==
After releasing 41 mixtapes between 2010 and 2013, Lil B's musical output began to diminish significantly. In 2015, he released only 1 mixtape—Free (Based Freestyles Mixtape), a 6-song collaboration with Chance the Rapper—as he took the year to focus more on his personal life. Speaking on his inactivity, Lil B told the East Bay Express that he was adopting a slower, more deliberate songwriting process, as part of an effort to make his music "more accessible". This marked a departure from his earlier work, which had been dominated by freestyles.

While writing Thugged Out Pissed Off, Lil B was inspired by the hardships he experienced throughout 2015. In January, his apartment building caught fire, damaging some of his music. He also faced the death of fellow Bay Area rapper The Jacka as well as one of his friends. Leading up to the mixtape's release, Lil B said that it touched on a wide range of topics, and hoped it would speak to people from marginalized communities.

== Composition ==
A hip hop mixtape, Thugged Out Pissed Off consists of 63 tracks and has a runtime of nearly four hours. Compared to Lil B's previous work, it features more cynical themes and darker production. The mixtape's lyrics mainly center around poverty and crime, although Lil B avoids moralizing. Thugged Out Pissed Off begins with "Come to the Waterfront Intro", which features a sample of Giorgio Moroder's Scarface theme. Writing for Pitchfork, Winston Cook-Wilson commented that the song "sets the mood for the tape pretty well".

The eighth track "With Me" features triumphant singing, which Cook-Wilson compared to the musician Tiny Tim. The song "BasedGod" is a remix of "Jumpman" by rappers Drake and Future. The thirteenth song, "I Was Born Poor", sees Lil B murmuring about his ancestry over a beat that features cymbals and sitar samples. "4 Tha Record", the sixteenth song on the mixtape, is a diss track directed at Canadian singer The Weeknd. On "Finess Em", the twenty-third song, Lil B raps about his come-up over a soul sample. The Southern rap beat of the following track, "Soul Food", is also built around a sample of a bluesy guitar line. On the song, Lil B raps about his aspirations and struggles. On the final track, "I Can't Breath", Lil B speaks out against racism, rape, censorship, and gun violence. The song's title is a reference to the last words of Eric Garner, a man killed by police in 2014.

== Release and promotion ==
Lil B announced Thugged Out Pissed Off on October 30, 2014. He released the single "Child Support Me" alongside a music video, although it was not included on the final track listing. On May 31, 2015, Lil B released "Soul Food" as Thugged Out Pissed Off's first single. An accompanying music video also premiered, in which he rides a mountain bike and puts dollar bills in a washing machine. "4 Tha Record" was released alongside a music video as the mixtape's second single on November 1, 2015. A few months later, on March 1, 2016, Lil B apologized to The Weeknd for releasing the song. In an interview with ILY magazine, he said that he regretted the diss after The Weeknd unfollowed him on Twitter.

On November 5, 2015, Lil B released "Flexin Maury Povich" as the mixtape's third single with an accompanying music video. He released the fourth single, "BasedGod ('Jumpman Remix')", on December 28. This single was also released alongside a music video, in which the song's producer, Metro Boomin, appears. Thugged Out Pissed Off was self-released to the mixtape-sharing platform DatPiff on December 30, 2015. It was uploaded to streaming services in April 2018.

== Critical reception ==
Professional ratings
Review scores
Source	Rating
Pitchfork	6.3/10
Tiny Mix Tapes	4/5 stars

Cook-Wilson wrote that Thugged Out Pissed Off "feels like B is just hitting a deadline and releasing what he has lying around". He also felt that the mixtape's middle two hours were boring, and considered it more forgettable than Lil B's previous releases.

Brooklyn Russell of Tiny Mix Tapes described Thugged Out Pissed Off as "another spotty mixtape from a rapper who ultimately drops many spotty projects". Russell disliked it for being needlessly offensive, and was particularly critical of "Domestic Violence Case", a song about domestic abuse. Russell wrote that the thirty-eighth song, "Listen Pay Attention", demonstrated Lil B's "underrated skills as a 'traditional' emcee". Russell also described the track "Handle Your Goals" as "particularly moving", and felt it proved there was "actual substance behind [Lil B's] words of encouragement".

== Track listing ==
All tracks are written by Brandon McCartney.

Thugged Out Pissed Off track listing
No.	Title	Length
1.	"Come to the Waterfront Intro"	3:01
2.	"Off Top"	3:35
3.	"I Love Bitches"	4:15
4.	"Stephen Hawking"	4:20
5.	"Kill Every Snitch"	4:42
6.	"Play the Hood"	2:39
7.	"Get Rich"	2:59
8.	"With Me"	4:45
9.	"Vest Off"	3:36
10.	"BasedGod"	3:15
11.	"Flexin Rick Ross"	3:08
12.	"In Love with the BasedGod"	3:56
13.	"I Was Born Poor"	4:06
14.	"Giving Up Remix"	2:37
15.	"Selling Jerry Based Freestyle"	3:28
16.	"4 tha Record"	4:04
17.	"Keep It So Gutta"	4:05
18.	"Maxwell"	3:39
19.	"I Am Pretty Boy Music"	3:20
20.	"Yun Wan Beef"	2:43
21.	"A Brick and FN"	2:57
22.	"Corna Sto"	2:21
23.	"Finess Em"	4:49
24.	"Soul Food"	5:29
25.	"Laugh Now Cry Later"	5:16
26.	"Ny Cab Won't Stop"	4:12
27.	"Stopping and Going"	2:56
28.	"Girlfriend on My Nerves"	2:48
29.	"With My Gunz Out"	3:55
30.	"Domestic Violence Case"	5:06
31.	"At Work"	3:10
32.	"Sellin Off Dummies"	3:24
33.	"Black Bih Stole"	3:30
34.	"I Am a Thug"	2:37
35.	"Take This Trip"	4:13
36.	"Multiple Mindstates"	4:08
37.	"Based Jam Remix"	2:36
38.	"Listen Pay Attention"	5:15
39.	"Water on the Paper"	3:50
40.	"Mines Well Be Hank"	2:50
41.	"Heaven for a G"	3:21
42.	"I'm Positive"	3:47
43.	"Everytime I Fail"	4:04
44.	"Handle Your Goals"	4:18
45.	"The BasedGods Coming"	2:00
46.	"Drop Out"	4:45
47.	"Don't Need Help"	3:19
48.	"Rules to Join"	4:07
49.	"I'm Goverment"	3:42
50.	"Flexin Maury Povich"	4:27
51.	"White Man"	3:36
52.	"Wild Wild West"	3:04
53.	"Light You Up"	3:12
54.	"Cash Out"	3:08
55.	"East Oakland International"	4:37
56.	"Smoking With Obama"	2:29
57.	"Tryna Buy Pussy"	3:31
58.	"Thugs Pain Remix Pt2"	5:03
59.	"2 Rich to Pimp Remix"	3:42
60.	"WLTGSM"	3:33
61.	"Ray Rice"	2:33
62.	"Bout That Unda"	2:28
63.	"I Can't Breath"	4:08
Total length:		230:29
