= Terror Assaulter: O.M.W.O.T. (One Man War on Terror) =

2015 graphic novel by Benjamin Marra

- The cover for Terror Assaulter: O.M.W.O.T. (One Man War on Terror)
- Creator: Benjamin Marra
- Date: 2015
- Page count: 110 pages
- Publisher: Fantagraphics

Terror Assaulter: O.M.W.O.T. (One Man War on Terror) is a 2015 American satirical action graphic novel created by writer-artist Benjamin Marra. A single chapter was initially published by Marra's own Traditional Comics label in 2014 before being reprinted by Fantagraphics alongside the remainder of the story the following year.

== Synopsis ==
After the 9/11 attacks President George W. Bush has signed off on the creation of the Terror Assaulters, a super-secret team of highly trained special agents who are allowed to roam freely overseas with no oversight, doing whatever is necessary to keep the enemies of America at bay. One such agent is codenamed O.M.W.O.T., or One Man War on Terror. He wipes out a terrorist cell in Jakarta after an attempt to buy a microchip due to be used in a cyberattack on America, even surviving when a ninja is sent to assassinate him. When a secretary in the office is captured by surviving Terrorists in a car the agent gives chase on a motorcycle, blowing up their car. He then commandeers another vehicle, snapping the neck of the owner, and drops the secretary off after arranging a date with here. O.M.W.O.T. then meets up with his contact, and plans to hit the drug lord behind the planned attack – but not before going on his date with the secretary. The date consists of the pair of them having sex in her apartment until an assassin bursts in and tries to kill the agent with throwing knives. However, the assassin is defeated and thrown out of the window.

O.M.W.O.T flies to Argentina to kill the drug lord but a group attempts to hijack it, killing a flight attendant and the pilots. The agent kills all of the hijackers and several other passengers and takes control of the plane. A male hostage the agent freed is so aroused by the violence he begins to perform oral sex on the agent, who lands the plane even after a dying terrorist uses a grenade to blow off the rear half of the plane. O.M.W.O.T is able to land the jet despite the damage and while having anal sex with the passenger, before immediately joining the Ultra Commando unit to raid the drug lord's base. They storm the compound with ease, preventing the drug lord from executing four hostages before O.M.W.O.T repeatedly stabs and then decapitates the villain. Returning to Washington, DC O.M.W.O.T is thanked by the President before travelling down to a secret base under the White House where the lizard-like real leaders of America are based. The hooded figures reveal that the whole operation was a cover to allow America to monopolise the illegal drug trade to fund the war on terror, and O.M.W.O.T is paid $200 billion as a reward.

The Terrorists are nevertheless able to invade America and take over every aspect of everyday life, with the Terror Assaulters forced underground. O.M.W.O.T foils Terrorist assaults on a school, a mall and L.A motorists before attacking the Terrorist Headquarters. He defeats the Boss of the Terrorists in combat and then kicks the man through a skyscraper window when he attempts to surrender, impaling him on a fence and incinerating him with a flamethrower as he falls. Later O.M.W.O.T masquerades as an investor in Internet Company, a Des Moines business that is using their website to turn people into Terrorists. He has sex with the company's vice president in a boardroom before being taken to the CEO – a former Terror Assaulter previously codenamed Freedom Warrior Champion – and revealing his true identity. The pair fight and O.M.W.O.T breaks the traitor's back as he is taunted about the mess the Terrorists have made of the country. Freedom Warrior Champion is then imprisoned.

While in prison Freedom Warrior Champion transitions to female and uses O.M.W.O.T's DNA to create a child clone of him. As a result a judge orders the pair to marry and live together. On their way home the couple visits the mall, leaving their son locked in the car and have sex in a lingerie store, with the sales assistant joining them. Later O.M.W.O.T, who now works for Financial Institution on Wall Street, finds a trio of punks vandalising his car and beats them before humiliating them in front of their school classmates. While successful at work the agent continues to have casual sex with male and female colleagues, as well as strippers. His wife learns of his infidelity and begs him to stop. Soon after the family are visiting the mall and O.M.W.O.T savagely beats a community leader when the latter steals his marking space before walking away from his family and seeing a vision of King Arthur.

== Influences ==
Marra has cited Jim Steranko's run on Nick Fury: Agent Of SHIELD, Rambo: First Blood: Part II and the films of Arizal as influences on the book, while crediting dubbed Italian crime films as inspiration for the dialogue.

== Reception ==
Reviewing the book for Paste, Hillary Brown was positive, calling it "a piece of art radiating strangeness, eager to be unpacked and experienced by different audiences." In her review for The Comics Journal, Sarah Horrocks identified it as "close to a raw fevered depiction of the white male id in a post 9/11 America" and surmised "It is a book that is as annoying and hipstery as it is visceral and wonderful. Graham Johnstone of Slings & Arrows rated the graphic novel at 3.5 out of 5, describing it as "arch satire" and comparing it to early episodes of Judge Dredd and the work of Sacha Baron Cohen. Tom Murphy of Broken Frontier praised the book's "mix of ludicrous action and deadpan delivery" in a positive review, while acknowledging it might not be to every reader's tastes.
