= Benjamin Marra =

American illustrator (born 1977)

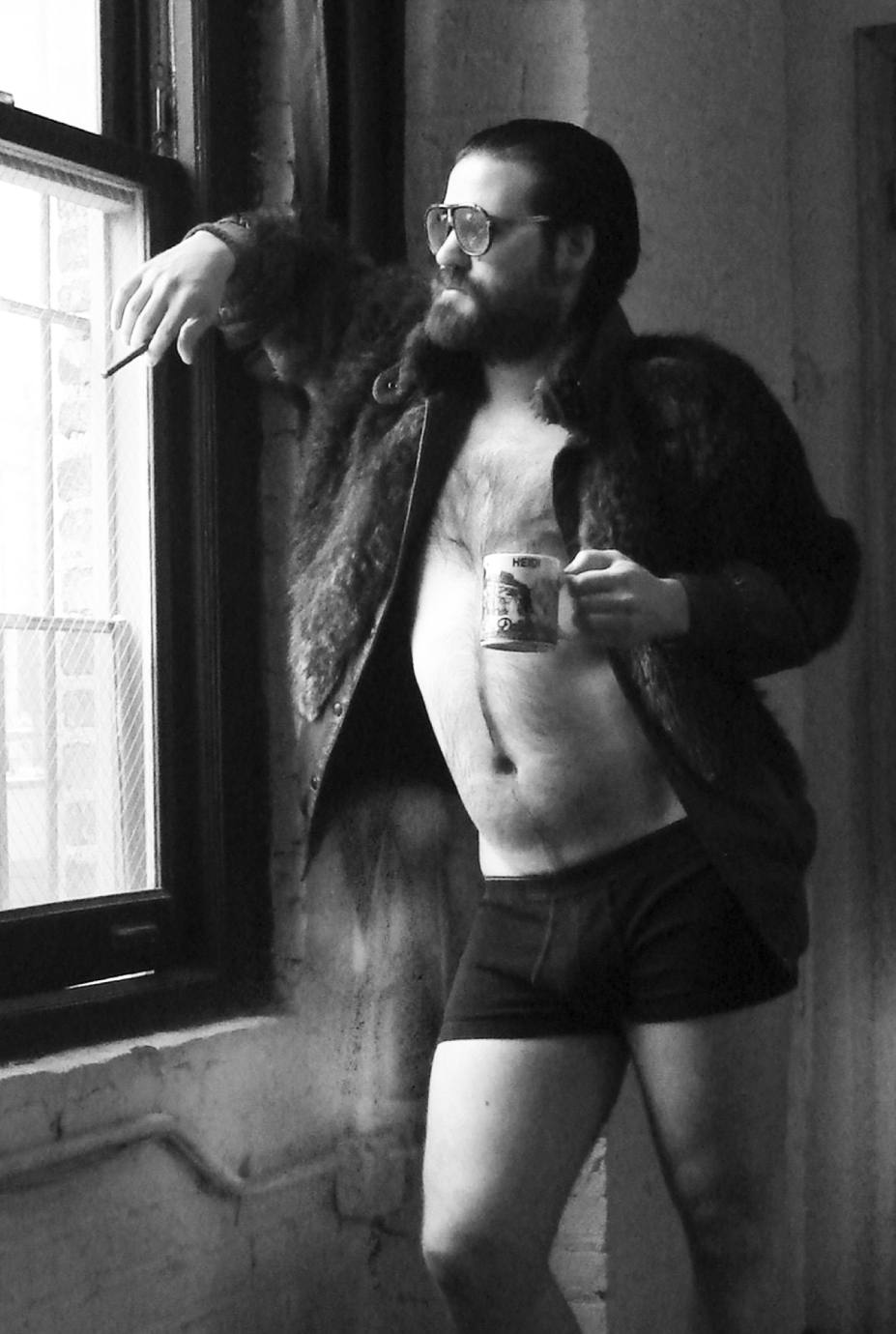
Benjamin Marra.

Benjamin Marra (born 1977 in Halifax, Nova Scotia) is a Grammy-nominated American illustrator and comic-book artist. His work has been mostly self-published under his own imprint, Traditional Comics, and mainly consists of black and white comics, printed on low-quality paper for a relatively low price. His drawing style is reminiscent of such artists as Paul Gulacy, Herb Trimpe and Spain Rodriguez, as well as the work of pinball machine graphic illustrators.

The first comic book to leave an impression on Marra was Darick Robertson's Space Beaver, a hyper-violent science-fiction story featuring an anthropomorphic beaver, which has served as an inspiration for his later work.

Marra's artistic training began at the School of Visual Arts, where his instructors included David Mazzucchelli, and where alternative comics artist Dash Shaw was a classmate. In 1998, Marra traveled to Florence, Italy to study painting.

Of his own art style, Marra says, "I kind of see what I'm doing as like what the Stooges and the Ramones were doing as a reaction to that big, self-indulgent arena rock aesthetic. Making it really raw, really punk rock, really earthy, DIY, really gut-level, very basic in its execution. Not a lot of technical efficiency. Just, like, three-chord power pop songs. Really short. It's supposed to hit you really fast, and it's got a really emotional basis instead of a technical basis. It's really based on people's emotional response.".

Marra's comics and illustrations have appeared in such diverse media as Playboy, Rolling Stone, The New York Times, Marvel Comics, Fantagraphics, Vice, Radar, Paper, Nylon, Widen+Kennedy and McCann-Erickson. He also drew the cover art for pioneering cloud rapper Lil B's visionary mixtape 6 Kiss. He also works as web designer for the Major League Baseball Advanced Media.

== Works ==
- Night Business (Traditional Comics, 4 issues, 2008)
- Gansta Rap Posse (Traditional Comics, 2 issues, 2009)
- Incredibly Fantastic Adventures of Maureen Dowd (Traditional Comics, single issue, 2010)
- Strange Tales II #3 (Marvel Comics, short story, 2010)
- The Naked Heroes (Traditional Comics, single issue, 2011)
- Drawings Inspired By American Psycho (Traditional Comics, single issue, 2011)
- Lincoln Washington Free Man (Traditional Comics, single issue, 2012)
- Ripper & Friends (Traditional Comics, single issue, 2012)
- Blades & Lazers (Traditional Comics, 2 issues, 2013)
- Terror Assaulter O.M.W.O.T. (One Man War On Terror) (Traditional Comics, single issue, 2014)
- Terror Assaulter O.M.W.O.T. (One Man War On Terror) (Fantagraphics Comics, graphic novel, 2015)
- American Blood (Fantagraphics, collected comic stories, 2016)
- Night Business (Fantagraphics, graphic novel, 2017)
- Jesusfreak (Image Comics, graphic novel with Joe Casey, 2019)
- Disciples (Fantagraphics, graphic novel with David Birke and Nicholas McCarthy, 2022)
- What We Mean by Yesterday: Vol. 1 (Fantagraphics, graphic novel, 2024)
- What We Mean by Yesterday: Vol. 2 (Fantagraphics, graphic novel, 2026)
