= 05 Fuck Em =

Mixtape by Lil B
- Released: December 24, 2013
- Genres: Hip hop; lo-fi
- Length: 5:45:08
- Label: BasedWorld

Lil B chronology
100% Gutta (2013)	05 Fuck Em (2013)	Basedworld Paradise (2014)

05 Fuck Em is a mixtape by American rapper Lil B. It was independently released on December 24, 2013, through Lil B's own record label, BasedWorld Records. Intended to be spread across six discs, the mixtape is the longest mixtape release by Lil B which is not a compilation - longer compilation mixtapes include the 676-track Free Music: The Complete MySpace Collection (2011) and 855 Song Based Freestyle Mixtape (2012). The mixtape verges on nearly six hours with 101 tracks.

== Background and music ==
The mixtape adopts eclectic production styles and further explores the music genres that Lil B experimented with in his career, including cloud rap, hyphy, trap and rap rock. The mixtape also features use of various samples. At least four tracks use samples from The Diplomats album, Diplomatic Immunity and the track "Lil B" uses the beat from LL Cool J's 1999 FUBU commercial song "Fatty Girl." The track, "Im the Rap God", features Lil B rapping over the instrumental version of System of a Down's 2001 song, "Toxicity", which was described as "a drunken-style karaoke freestyle" and "your friend's blunt-smoking roommate doing an impression of MC Ride on the choruses." The track, "G.O.R. (God of Rap)" lasts for ten minutes and starts with a sample from 1991 film Barton Fink, accompanied by atmospheric guitar and drum beat, before evolving into a sample by symphonic metal band Nightwish. "Twurk Sum" contains an interpolation of "Homelife is a Drag" by punk band No-Cash. The song "Im Gunna Be a Doctor" uses a sample from Twista's 2003 song, "Slow Jamz", which was produced by Kanye West.

Production on the album was handled by a range of people, including longtime collaborators like Keyboard Kid and Lou Pocus, as well as Mac Miller.

The lyrics of the song range from confessionals, free associations, motivational speeches, and uncensored sex talk. The themes include brooding, anger at the prison industrial complex, and emotional conflicts.

== Critical reception ==
Professional ratings
Review scores
Source	Rating
Consequence of Sound	C+
Rolling Stone	3/5 stars

The album generally received mixed to positive reviews from music critics. Consequence of Sound reviewer Pat Levy described the album as "arguably the most complete and complex piece of work that Lil B has produced to date" and wrote that it "showcases his ability to maneuver his persona over a number of different production styles." Nevertheless, he also stated: "Maybe his 'Control Response' is far-fetched for his talents, but it's not like he's struggling for relevance." Christopher R. Weingarten of Rolling Stone described the album as "his grandest gesture yet." He commented that "the mixtape reaches the highest highs of the best Lil B songs," while criticizing the "id-fueled" sexual fantasies, which he thought "end up stealing the spotlight from an album that's at its best when showing its sensitive core."

== Track listing ==
#	Title	Length	Producer(s)	Sample(s)
1	"Intro"	3:46	Keyboard Kid	
2	"Welcome to 05"	2:39	Honorable C.N.O.T.E.	
3	"4 My"	3:34	Puablo Stay Trippin	
4	"So Thirsty"	4:23	Issue	
5	"Strip You"	2:57	Sage the Gemini	"Red Nose" by Sage the Gemini
6	"Lil B"	1:52	Trackmasters	"Fatty Girl" by LL Cool J
7	"Liii"	3:08		
8	"Twurk Sum"	2:52	King Christian	
9	"Lil B's Layer"	3:06	Totem	
10	"Goin Platinum"	1:55		"DJ Enuff Freestyle" by The Diplomats
11	"No Mo Blow"	3:47	Gord Z	
12	"GOR "God of Rap"	10:19	Trah, Karmaeiic, Neros Beats	
13	"Simple Math"	2:54	Iced Out	
14	"You Unda"	4:01	Na'Listen	
15	"Prayin' 4 a Brick"	4:24		
16	"Free da Wurld"	4:39		
17	"I Am the Rawest Rapper"	2:46	Sounds	
18	"RIP Kennedy"	4:20	Needlz	"Hurt Me Soul" by Lupe Fiasco
19	"Smack"	2:24		
20	"Licks and Ducktape"	2:44	Mayo Nice	
21	"Strong Arm"	3:45		
22	"Love B"	3:07	Na'Listen, TD Cruze	
23	"Blow"	3:07	Certified Hitz	
24	"Lanlord"	4:01		
25	"Switch Lanes"	3:25	T.A.	
26	"Rock Up 4sho"	3:21		"I'm Ready" by The Diplomats
27	"New York Anthem"	3:44		
28	"People Like Me"	4:14		
29	"Rob the Jeweler"	4:27	Chris High	"Right Now" by Samantha James
30	"Gutta Work"	3:24		
31	"Free Bandz"	3:10	araabMUZIK	
32	"Insurance"	2:32	Trill Spector	
33	"BGYCFMB"	3:43	J Gramm	"Upper Echelon" by Travis Scott featuring T.I. and 2 Chainz
34	"Lick a Shot"	3:36	The Legacy	
35	"Bitch KT"	3:31	Lil Fireworkz	
36	"Ellen Degeneres (Remix)"	4:01	ImJustTheWaterBoy	
37	"10k Summa"	2:38		
38	"1 Night in Florida"	3:17	Dosage	
39	"FMBN"	3:30		"Curtis (50 Cent Diss)" by Cam'ron
40	"I'm the Rap God"	3:35		"Toxicity" by System of a Down
41	"Ruff Ryder"	1:33		
42	"Stright Up"	3:30		
43	"Amis Scur"	1:07		
44	"Mount Up"	1:58		
45	"Act Right"	3:47		
46	"Built to Survive"	3:47	Huey Daze	
47	"Dear Mama"	2:51	LBF	
48	"I'm Gunna Be a Doctor"	3:00	Kanye West	"Slow Jamz" by Twista feat. Kanye West and Jamie Foxx
49	"Bloggers Anthem"	2:55		
50	"Gutta Goin' Platinum"	5:01		
51	"Beat the Ho Up"	3:00		"My Love" by The Diplomats
52	"Stop Selling Dope"	3:02		
53	"Motivation (Remix)"	2:51	Neros Beats	
54	"Painful Intermission"	3:44	The Cuts Crew	
55	"1 Mo"	2:57	Drip-133	
56	"Stressful"	4:16		
57	"U C Me"	2:18		
58	"Hummus or Crack"	3:21	Tazmanian Tiger	
59	"Hardest to Do It"	3:32	Lil Zen	
60	"05 Fuck Em"	2:35	Harlem Sekani	
61	"Control Response"	3:13		"Paid in Ful"l by Vado
62	"Is This Life"	3:37		
63	"So Posh"	3:34	Gord Z	
64	"Buy a Ho"	2:47	Sneaky Mike	
65	"Cought a Case"	3:41		
66	"Let Em Go B"	3:41		
67	"Cocaine Option"	4:11	T.A., AudioXVNVX	
68	"Do da BasedGod"	2:46	Keyboard Kid	
69	"Wolfpack Foreva"	3:19	Kanye West	"Dipset Forever" by Cam'ron
70	"Do It Like Bluit"	2:14		
71	"I Need"	2:10	Josh Refe	
72	"Kurt Angle"	4:05	Iced Out	
73	"My Garage (Remix)"	4:33	Zaytoven	
74	"I Own Swag (Remix)"	3:25	Humbeats	
75	"Quit Stealing Swag"	3:54	Ransom Beats	"Shit" by Future
76	"Last Dance (Remix)"	3:41	Zaytoven, Knucklehead	
77	"Texas or Florida"	3:02		"Ground Zero" by The Diplomats
78	"Servin Rocks"	4:07	Sonic Sounds	
79	"Gotta Pay Me"	3:15	Swimful	
80	"Pixar"	2:21	Mac Miller	
81	"Snitch"	4:18	Marl Borough	"Onward" by Yes
82	"Waddup"	2:30	Dosage	
83	"Bar Mitzvah"	3:20	Korda Beats	
84	"Dying Breed"	3:19	Ty-Tracks	"Harlem Streets" by Cam'ron
85	"Welcome Home"	3:07	Kaine Solo	
86	"Based News"	3:09		
87	"Before the Diary"	1:32	Lou Pocus	
88	"Block Report"	3:25		
89	"To the Sky"	3:38	Kanye West	"Dreams" by The Game
90	"We Did It"	3:32	Lou Pocus	
91	"We Still Winnin'"	4:02	Snapy Dee	
92	"HB"	2:57		
93	"Look in My Eyes"	2:42	DJ Devastator	"Where Was Heaven" by Wu-Syndicate
94	"Dope Lines"	4:01	Lou Pocus	
95	"Yee"	3:51	Not Mine	
96	"I'm So Hood"	2:21		
97	"Stealing From Strippers"	5:47	G5 Kids	
98	"From the Bay"	3:34		
99	"4 My (Clean Radio Edit)"	3:34		
100	"Hadouken (Based Freestyle)"	4:28	Madison Carter	
101	"05 Out"	4:33	Keyboard Kid	
