= No Black Person Is Ugly =

Song by Lil B

from the album Ultimate Bitch
- Released: July 30, 2014
- Genre: Hip hop
- Length: 4:02
- Songwriter(s): Lil B; Gábor Szabó; Alex North
- Producer(s): Certified Hitz

"No Black Person Is Ugly" is a song by American rapper Lil B, released on his 2014 mixtape Ultimate Bitch. The song was released with its accompanying music video on July 30, 2014, prior to the mixtape's release on October 14, 2014. The song received critical acclaim and was included in music publications' year-end lists.

== Music and lyrics ==
"No Black Person Is Ugly" is a hip hop song and samples Hungarian jazz guitarist Gábor Szabó's "Magical Connection", originally composed by Alex North. The song features "a relatively traditional flow," compared to Lil B's other works.

The song's lyrics deal with race and identity in present-day America. It explores Lil B's condemnations and criticisms of "police brutality, beauty standards found on magazine covers, and the knot-in-stomach self-loathing that he sees as an intentional media construct," The lyrics, which touch upon "how far the media has to go in its representations of African-American people in pop culture," alternate between his "black power declarations and his appeals for global solidarity against racism, rape, and all such violence." The song delivers its positive message through its hook: "No black person is ugly, don’t say it one time."

== Critical reception ==
The song received rave reviews from music critics. Pitchfork's Jayson Greene awarded the song with a "Best New Track" tag, writing: "He opens with in a tightly packed flow that tricks you into expecting a linear, coherent performance. But you soon realize it’s Lil B straight through, a string of small, disconnected sentences tracing the contours of some big, connected thoughts." Greene concludes that, "when Lil B is at his best, you feel him looking you directly in the eye." Another Pitchfork critic, David Drake, compared the song to Kendrick Lamar's "i", eventually stating: "No Black Person Is Ugly" treats self-love as a radical panacea for the moment, a method of wrestling with grand antagonisms on a personal level." Ryan Kristobak of The Huffington Post stated that "rapper's unfiltered stream of consciousness permits him to really focus in on his flow and subject matter" and concluded: "No Black Person Is Ugly" is Lil B's most purposeful and uplifting song." Josiah Hughes of Exclaim!, who described the track as "a sweet, positive, uplifting rap song," commented: "It's the flip side to B's freaked-out similes and wacky non sequiturs, and a reminder that he's [Lil B] one of the most important rappers we've got."

Matthew Trammel of The Fader wrote: "It's been harder to find these kind of messages in a genre where it was once second-nature, but B manages to inspire without coming off preachy." Olivia Forman of Spin described the song as an "anti-racism anthem" and wrote: "Hopefully he’s not too right with the lyric that he’s 'too real for the game,' but it seems only the Based God could fashion such a profound anthem without coming off preachy, using his experience to lead by example." Justin Charity of Complex thought: "Clearly, Lil B is taking his rap god status a notch or two more seriously than we're used to hearing."

The song was ranked number 15 on Pitchfork Media's "the 100 Best Tracks of 2014" and number 23 on the Huffington Post's "The 23 Best Songs of 2014" lists.

== Music video ==
The music video for the song was released on July 30, 2014 with the title "Most Powerful Song of the Decade?". The video shows Lil B interacting with a diverse range of unposed strangers, including police officers. According to Olivia Forman of Spin, one of the shots shows Lil B's hand "grazing over a white-washed magazine stand that clearly illustrates the overwhelming standard of light-skinned beauty in America."
