= Hoop Life =

2014 mixtape by Lil B

Mixtape by Lil B
- Released: June 1, 2014
- Genre: Hip hop
- Length: 121:02
- Label: BasedWorld
- Producer: 333 Boyz; 808 Mafia; Certified Hitz; Cool & Dre; Eskay; Giorgio Momurder; HNRK; Jamz; Jay Ant; Keyboard Kid; Laerec; Lazy Kev; Lilken138th; Mark Gee; Metro Boomin; Napszbeats; Prada Bwah; Schwarz; Slavery; TD Cruze; The Heisman; TheOnlyCasanova; Uptown Greg; Vitamine Dave; Young Chop

Lil B chronology
Basedworld Paradise (2014)	Hoop Life (2014)	Ultimate Bitch (2014)

Singles from Hoop Life
- 1. "Katy Perry" Released: March 1, 2014

Hoop Life is a mixtape by American rapper Lil B. It was digitally released on June 1, 2014, through Lil B's own record label, BasedWorld Records. The mixtape mainly features basketball-themed songs.

The song, "Fuck KD", a diss track to Kevin Durant following their feud, was released on March 8, 2014 along with an accompanying music video. Notably, the mixtape was released the day after Durant's Oklahoma City Thunder was eliminated from the 2014 NBA playoffs by the San Antonio Spurs. The music videos for the tracks "Fuck KD", "Gotta Make the NBA", "Katy Perry", and "Hoop Life" were also released throughout March, April and May 2014. On November 30, 2020, a sequel to Hoop Life was released using YouTube titled "Hoop Life 2". Hoop Life 2 was later made available for streaming platforms on December 7, 2020.

== Reception ==
In a positive review, Billy Haisley of Deadspin praised Lil B's handling of basketball related themes and topics, though pointed out that some unrelated songs on the project were derivative of his previous work: "...Hoop Life is a typical Lil B mixtape, from the celebrity songs to the ignorant, crass, and often great cooking songs to the positive and explicitly #based ideological songs... Other tracks, however, uphold the narrative promise of 'Gotta Make the NBA'... the "player on the come-up" stories have the most depth". Phil Witmer of Vice considered Hoop Life an "essential" Lil B mixtape, acknowledging the basketball concept and dubbing the production "Bay Area-styled post-hyphy that's as warm and inviting as a summer day"

The diss track "Fuck KD" was singled out for particular praise. The Fader considered the track "better than it needed to be" while also praising the songs "NBA Live" and "Real Based".

In 2021, the song "Ski Ski BasedGod" was widely used in the viral "devious lick" TikTok trend where students would record themselves stealing or vandalizing items from their schools.

== Track listing ==
No.	Title	Producer(s)	Length
1.	"Pass the Ball"	333 Boyz; Schwarz	3:36
2.	"At the Freethrow"	Jay Ant	4:13
3.	"NBATV Commercial"	Giorgio Momurder	2:45
4.	"Off da Bench"		5:01
5.	"Material Mindstate"	Lazy Kev	2:48
6.	"Pass the Roc"	Napszbeats	2:39
7.	"Call Me Coach"	Vitamine Dave	3:25
8.	"Hoop Life"	Laerec	2:53
9.	"Foul Out"	Jay Ant	4:05
10.	"Payton on Broncos on Wizards"	Jamz	3:25
11.	"Hall of Fame"	Certified Hitz	2:54
12.	"Marbel Floors and Pain"	TD Cruze	3:37
13.	"Lockdown"		3:44
14.	"Your Going to the League"	Keyboard Kid	5:31
15.	"Good Day"	Uptown Greg	4:03
16.	"Don't Go Outside"	TheOnlyCasanova	4:23
17.	"Living My Life"	Mark Gee	2:55
18.	"Ski Ski BasedGod"	Eskay; Slavery	2:59
19.	"Pretty Boy Anthem"	Eskay	3:27
20.	"Only Time I Slow Down"		4:11
21.	"NBA Live"	808 Mafia; Metro Boomin; Young Chop	2:08
22.	"Scouts Report"		4:30
23.	"Gotta Make the NBA"		4:02
24.	"Real Based"		3:07
25.	"Fuck KD (Kevin Durant Diss)"	Cool & Dre	3:41
26.	"NBA Stole My Swag"	Lilken138th	3:49
27.	"I Got Bitches 2014"	Keyboard Kid; The Heisman	4:12
28.	"Katy Perry"		4:02
29.	"See Me in the Game"	HNRK	3:06
30.	"Mack Maine"		3:57
31.	"Who I Want"	Prada Bwah	3:49
32.	"I Choose Her"	Keyboard Kid	4:35
33.	"Clink Clink" (Clean Version)	Certified Hitz	3:13
Total length:			121:02
