= Rain in England =

Studio album by Lil B
- Released: September 21, 2010
- Genres: Experimental hip-hop; new-age; spoken word; outsider
- Length: 73:52
- Label: Weird Forest
- Producer: The Based God

Lil B chronology
Blue Flame (2010)	Rain in England (2010)	MF Based (2010)

Rain in England is the debut solo studio album by the American rapper Lil B, released through Weird Forest on September 21, 2010. Produced by Lil B under his persona "The Based God", Rain in England is unusual for the hip-hop genre because it has no percussive beats. Instead, Lil B raps over new-age-style synthesizer music. The lyrical style, which finds Lil B speaking on topics like family, love and death, has been noted for its sincerity and reflectiveness.

The album had a mixed reception upon release; some critics and artists praised its unorthodox musical and lyrical content, while others were left baffled. According to Louis Pattison of The Guardian, the album "transcended familiar notions of good and bad, being one of the most peculiar rap albums ever pressed".

== Background and music ==
Before Rain in England, Lil B had developed a cult following through social media by sharing music through YouTube and MySpace. Lil B wrote the lyrics to Rain in England in a coffee shop over the course of about a month. It was also his first time producing his own music, though he credited the production as a collaboration with his alter ego The Based God. In advance of the album's release, Lil B told XXL that Rain in England would be "one of the best hip-hop albums to ever come out and one of the most unique albums to ever come out in hip-hop". Lil B described it as "like a melting pot to the soul, just thinking and melting into your emotions", and said the album would deal with both dark and positive themes.

Rain in England is described by Lil B as the first ambient hip-hop album. The lyrics, described as meditative and surreal, explore themes like death, life, family, God, birth and gender. Most tracks begin with Lil B announcing the theme, which he then contemplates in a zigzag of free associative thought. Lil B took care not to use profanity at all on the album. The synthesizer music is droning and tonally simple; one critic compared the tonality to the nursery rhyme "Three Blind Mice". Tom Breihan of Pitchfork called Rain in England "an album of quasi-rap spoken-word over self-produced music even more ambient than the spaced-out, lo-fi synth landscapes he usually raps over". Nitsuh Abebe wrote in Pitchfork's "Why We Fight" column that the album is "beatless washes of new-agey synths with Lil B flowing over them more like the host of a self-hypnosis tape than a rapper." Rain in England has been compared to the music of Brian Eno, Stars of the Lid, Ray Lynch and Tangerine Dream.

== Release and reception ==
"Birth to Life"
"Birth to Life", the album's opening track, demonstrates the ambient synth sounds and Lil B's nearly spoken word-style flow used throughout the album.

Rain in England was released on September 21, 2010 on the independent label Weird Forest, which usually focuses on experimental and electronic music. The album was released digitally, as a CD, and as a double LP edition of 1000 copies with a poster. Pitchfork called it "a rare opportunity to own a physical Lil B artifact". The album officially became available for free from the mixtape website DatPiff on November 22.

Critical reception to the album was mixed, with writers acknowledging the album's uniqueness but questioning its lyrical and musical quality. Sam Davies of The Wire wrote, "There are hits and misses: platitudes and cliches, interspersed with bursts of surreal genius. [...] So much indie hiphop [sic] tries to challenge mainstream orthodoxy through a cryptic acceleration of thought and voice [...] but Lil B's slower, more ruminative delivery here feels far braver for being more exposed and vulnerable." A positive review in Vice called Lil B "the most revolutionary MC of the last 15 years," but said Rain in England is not a good starting point for people new to his music because the album is "a bit too raw for most life forms to process". Rating the album a 6 out of 10, Charles Aaron of Spin said the album was Lil B's "least accessible" release to date and sounded like "a therapy-session testimony that sounds like Soulja Boy having a Damascus moment in the champagne room over a beatless synth tide."

Blogger Andrew Nosnitsky of hip-hop blog Cocaine Blunts wrote, "while it's a very personal and honest affair there's also something, well, not quite good about it. The early buzz about B was that he was making outsider art and England is probably the closest he comes to that standard. He has ideas about what the creation of spoken word poetry and ambient music entails but it's quite clear he hasn't taken a ton of time to study those forms." David Morris of Tiny Mix Tapes said that although the album is "conceptually daring" and a showcase for Lil B's "poetic, philosophical streak", he called the musical backing "utter garbage" and "pure, unstructured noodling". Morris blamed what he saw as a misguided effort to be "left-field and trendy" on Lil B's internet hype and coverage in the indie rock press. The Quietus praised the album as "baffling, flawed but utterly engrossing", and said Lil B's flow is "more measured but no less dexterous than his contemporaries, and the pace of his eloquent, brooding verses lend themselves well to the alien, frosted glass synth sounds and syrupy electronics that form the majority of the backing tracks here. Rain In England comes across like the work of some rap savant, a man whose inner filter has been disabled, creating something which may polarise but which is, at least, utterly distinctive." Daniel Levin Becker wrote in Dusted that, despite its unconventionality, the album is "irredeemably bad".

== Legacy ==
Rain in England has been repeatedly referenced for its uniqueness and its demonstration of Lil B's broad range of styles. Hip-hop writer Andrew Nosnitsky remarked in The Wire that Lil B was likely the only rapper who could pull off both an ambient release on Weird Forest and a collaboration with Soulja Boy in the same year. The San Francisco Bay Guardian said the album demonstrated Lil B's unpredictability; similarly, SF Weekly called it "a different beast entirely" from the rest of his work. In Seattle Weekly, Eric Grandy called Rain in England an "oddity" and said Lil B's music is better served by randomly listening to him on YouTube then in a long-form album format. In a 2012 profile of Lil B's career so far, The Wire's Lisa Blanning said the album "feels like a new musical expression". Lil B himself described Rain in England as "my favorite work ... I think that's my most powerful work, to myself. ... That's my favorite, because I know no one else has done that, and that's what I'm most proud of, when I do things that I know nobody else has done before."

At the end of the year, the album received one vote in the Village Voice Pazz & Jop music critics poll. Rob Sevier, co-founder of the label The Numero Group, and Games, a collaboration between Daniel Lopatin (Oneohtrix Point Never) and Joel Ford, named Rain in England one of their favorite albums of the year. Dean Blunt of the electronic duo Hype Williams admired the album and said, "it was artistic, it was the merit. ... Part of the reason it's so interesting, part of the reason why I think this is so good, it's a juxtaposition of two things that you really don't think are meant to be together." Oakland, California rapper Kreayshawn said Lil B "was an influence on me. I was starting to listen to his music and hanging out with him a lot when he was working on Rain in England." Cloud rap duo Main Attrakionz has been compared to the style of Rain in England.

At Lil B's unscripted lecture at New York University in 2012, a fan told Lil B, possibly facetiously, that his mom cried while listening to the track "All Women". Lil B responded:

I love you. Thank you family. I love you man. Respect knowledge. If you see somebody with gray hair, embrace that beauty. Show the world that we are beautiful! That was me trying to get everybody to rally. Show the world we're beautiful!

Lil B also said at the lecture that he was "the first artist ever to release an ambient album in history with no cursing, Rain in England." Portland-based producer E*Rock adapted a transcript of the lecture into an ambient music piece with a synthesized voice, and the result was compared to Rain in England.

== Track listing ==
No.	Title	Length
1.	"Birth to Life"	3:48
2.	"Everything"	5:56
3.	"Just Dream"	4:55
4.	"Love Is Strange"	3:35
5.	"My Windowsill"	5:30
6.	"All Women"	3:17
7.	"Earth's Medicine"	6:12
8.	"I Am the Hellraiser"	6:59
9.	"My Business"	8:10
10.	"Hate Is Fear"	6:21
11.	"Letter to Family"	4:53
12.	"All My Life"	5:32
13.	"Death"	3:31
14.	"God Kissed Me"	5:39
Total length:		73:52
