= Choices and Flowers =

Studio album by The BasedGod
- Released: May 17, 2012
- Genres: New age; ambient; outsider
- Length: 94:53
- Label: BasedWorld
- Producers: The BasedGod; Lil B (exec.)

The BasedGod chronology
Trapped in BasedWorld (2012)	Choices and Flowers (2012)	Water is D.M.G. Pt. 1 (2012)

Choices and Flowers is the first instrumental studio album by American rapper Lil B, released under the moniker The BasedGod. It was digitally released on May 17, 2012, through Lil B's own record label, BasedWorld Records. The album consists of instrumental versions of songs from his previous releases Rain in England, Dior Paint and Roses Exodus. Lil B has described the album as his "classical music debut", although most critics have instead classified it as a new age album. It was followed later in 2012 by a second "classical" album released under the BasedGod name, Tears 4 God.

The album charted at Billboard New Age Albums chart, peaking at number 6.

== Background ==
Despite being labeled as "classical music" by Lil B, the album features new-age instrumental tracks, recorded on a multitracked synthesizer. The songs are improvised and feature descending patterns and varied rhythms, without any "recognizable meter." All songs, except the last track "Welcome to America", are pitched to C-B-A-G notes. The compositions feature various keyboard patches and pads to produce string, electric piano, oboe, clarinet, sitar and koto sounds.

Lil B credited himself as the executive producer of the album, echoing the imitation of two different personas. The cover art of the album was painted by artist Roberta Stewart and was compared to the works of painter Marlene Dumas.

== Critical reception ==
The album received mixed reviews, with many critics questioning the authenticity of the "classical tag" and focusing on the song titles. Christian Hertzog, the classical music critic of LA Weekly criticized Lil B's use of the tag, citing "the extensive use of synthesizers, uninteresting" improvisation and the limited melodies. Nevertheless, he also noted that "Lil B has will and the musical curiosity" and urged him to learn to play an instrument and take theory and composition lessons. Duncan Cooper of The Fader described the album as "95 minutes of atonal synth noodling" and compared it to Lil B's previous ambient hip hop album, Rain in England (2010). Miles Raymer of Chicago Reader wrote that "the album sounds like Lil B loaded up some strings and pads in a synth program, did about a hundred bong rips, and just let the music flow out of him, despite the fact that he maybe doesn't technically 'know' how to play the keyboard."

== Track listing ==
All tracks composed by The BasedGod.

1. "I Made the Right Choice" – 5:44
2. "Lessons from the Wind" – 7:12
3. "Walking Through Berkeley" – 6:06
4. "My Mistakes" – 4:17
5. "New York I'm Home" – 6:24
6. "Where Are You Going" – 3:37
7. "Lost in the Sky of Love" – 4:47
8. "Save the Animals" – 5:22
9. "Happy to Live" – 7:21
10. "What Came First Are We Alive" – 8:05
11. "Tokyo" – 3:03
12. "Tribute to Lil B" – 4:54
13. "At the Zoo With Mom" – 4:49
14. "Dreams Are Real" – 5:10
15. "Exhale With Love in Your Chest" – 3:29
16. "Wooden Hotel" – 5:42
17. "Welcome to America" – 12:27

== Chart positions ==
Chart (2012)	Peak position
US Billboard New Age Albums	6
