= Free (Based Freestyles Mixtape) =

Mixtape by Lil B & Chance the Rapper
- Released: August 5, 2015
- Recorded: July 18, 2015
- Genre: Hip-hop
- Length: 36:03
- Producers: AK-47; Gigglebox; Nate Fox; Uptown Greg

Lil B chronology
Ultimate Bitch (2014)	Free (Based Freestyles Mixtape) (2015)	Thugged Out Pissed Off (2015)

Chance the Rapper chronology
Surf (2015)	Free (Based Freestyles Mixtape) (2015)	Coloring Book (2016)

Free (Based Freestyles Mixtape) is a collaborative mixtape by American rappers Lil B and Chance the Rapper. It was self-released for free download on August 5, 2015.

== Background and recording ==
Free was recorded in Chicago—Chance the Rapper's hometown—on July 18, 2015. The recording session was supervised by engineers/producers Jeff Arenson and Aidan Sigel-Bruse.

== Composition ==
Free consists of six tracks. Writing for Consequence, Adam Kivel compared it to a "pretty good episode of an improvised podcast".

The opening track, "Last Dance", features a guest appearance from Noname Gypsy. Pitchfork's Winston Cook-Wilson compared the beat on the track "Do My Dance" to that on Chance the Rapper's song "Chain Smoker" (2013).

== Release ==
On July 18, 2015, Chance the Rapper and Lil B announced that they had recorded a collaborative mixtape together. Later that month, Chance the Rapper appeared on Wild 94.1, and called it "a masterpiece" and "a classic".

Two weeks later, Free (Based Freestyles Mixtape) was self-released on August 5, 2015. It was uploaded to Lil B's SoundCloud account for free download.

== Critical reception ==
Professional ratings
Review scores
Source	Rating
Exclaim!	3.5/5 stars
NME	6/10
Pitchfork	7.7/10
Rolling Stone	3.5/5 stars
Spin	7/10

Sheldon Pearce of HipHopDX and Dean Van Nguyen of NME considered the final track, "We Rare", to be the best on the mixtape.

Writing for Exclaim!, Calum Slingerland said that "Free's greatest moments come when the pair play off each other's rap skills".

== Track listing ==
No.	Title	Music	Length
1.	"Last Dance"	Uptown Greg	3:42
2.	"What's Next"	AK-47	5:47
3.	"First Mixtape"	Gigglebox	7:00
4.	"Amen"	Nate Fox	9:20
5.	"Do My Dance"	Uptown Greg	5:36
6.	"We Rare"	Nate Fox	4:37
Total length:			36:03

=== Track notes ===
- "Last Dance" contains uncredited vocals from Noname.
