= Hot take =

Immediate opinionated/controversial statement on news events

In journalism, a hot take is a "piece of deliberately provocative commentary that is based almost entirely on shallow moralizing" in response to a news story, "usually written on tight deadlines with little research or reporting, and even less thought".

It originated as a term in the industry of sports talk radio (and in turn by shared televised simulcasts of those shows to fill dead time on networks and sports-related debate shows, sports television itself), referring to the tactic of hosts picking "a topic from the sports zeitgeist, often one that has no business being discussed because the answer is unknowable", making "loud, fact-free declarations" about the topic, eliciting angry listeners to call in and providing show content. The New York Times Styles section defines a hot take as "a hastily assembled but perhaps heartfelt piece of incendiary opinionated content".

The term gained popularity in sports journalism in 2012 to describe the coverage of National Football League quarterback Tim Tebow and was analyzed in a Pacific Standard article by Tomás Ríos. It became increasingly used in other forms of journalism in 2014 after a piece on The Awl by John Herrman to describe the economic pressure on online publishers to produce instant, often glib, responses to current events.

In April 2015, BuzzFeed editor Ben Smith wrote on Twitter: "We are trying not to do hot takes", to explain the deletion of two articles that were critical of the site's advertisers. Jezebel's Jia Tolentino argued that the articles were instead "actually in service of an idea" and that based on Herrman's definition of hot take, ideas were positive alternatives to hot takes.

Hot takes are often associated with social media, where they can be easily shared and commented on by both readers and other journalists, a lucrative environment for publishers that encourages recursive "meta-takes", which John West described as "a black hole from which no attention can escape". The prevalence of hot takes on social media has also contributed to the term taking on the broader sense of an unpopular or controversial opinion outside of journalism.

== See also ==
- Clickbait
- Rage farming
- Troll (slang)
