= God's Father =

Mixtape by Lil B
- Released: February 27, 2012
- Genre: West Coast hip hop; cloud rap; new age
- Length: 117:09
- Label: BasedWorld
- Producer: Aeon Flex; AJ Rice; AK47; BigBoyTraks; Certified Hitz; Clams Casino; C.O.D.; Devon Hendryx; DJ Paul; James; Juicy J; Killah Kibba; Lost Planets; Lou Pocus; Merkabah 13; Moka Only; Nem270; On Ice; Seedeeaaa; Sonic Sounds; Swiff D; Talen Ted; Terio; The Colleagues; Tony Stone

Lil B chronology
White Flame (2012)	God's Father (2012)	#1 Bitch (2012)

Singles from God's Father
- 1. "See Ya" Released: February 28, 2012

God's Father is a mixtape by American rapper Lil B. It was released on February 27, 2012 through Lil B's BasedWorld Records label. Featuring 34 tracks, the mixtape has received positive reviews from music critics.

== Critical reception ==
Professional ratings
Aggregate scores
Source	Rating
Metacritic	75/100
Review scores
Source	Rating
Beats per Minute	78/100
Pitchfork	8.0/10
Spin	7/10
XXL	Mixed

Upon its release, God's Father mixtape received positive reviews from music critics. At Metacritic, which assigns a normalized rating out of 100 to reviews from critics, the album received an average score of 75, which indicates "generally favorable reviews", based on 4 reviews. Chris Letso of Beats per Minute wrote: "God's Father is nearly two hours long, and it's actually good." Letso also thought that "the cohesiveness of God’s Father in the face of all these approaches is what makes it a great mixtape." Pitchfork critic Jayson Greene stated: "It's probably his most immersive single release--or album, or mixtape, or emanation, or whatever--in a year and a half, better than both Based God Velli and I'm Gay." Mike Powell of Spin described the album as "the most fulfilling Lil B release yet." XXL magazine's Adam Fleischer was more mixed in his review and thought: "His quick delivery is impressive and B shows that he actually owns the technical skills to properly ride a beat—even though he doesn’t often choose to employ them." Nevertheless, Fleischer also further wrote: "How long his self-professed revolution lasts and in which direction the quality heads remains to be seen, but there’s no doubt that Lil B won’t be slowing down any time soon."

== Track listing ==
No.	Title	Producer(s)	Length
1.	"The BasedGods Layer"	C.O.D.	4:02
2.	"I Own Swag"	Swiff D	3:28
3.	"Fuck Ya Money"	BigBoyTraks	4:08
4.	"Februarys Confessions"	Lou Pocus	4:30
5.	"Buss Em 4 Points"	Lou Pocus	3:00
6.	"Tropics"	BigBoyTraks	4:00
7.	"Real Hip Hop 2012"	Lost Planets	4:04
8.	"Keep It 100"	DJ Paul; Juicy J	4:19
9.	"Fonk Aint Dead"	Aeon Flex	2:49
10.	"Feds at My Doh"	AK47	4:07
11.	"Remy"	Nem270	3:08
12.	"Flowers Rise"	Merkabah 13	2:21
13.	"God Help Me"	Sonic Sounds	4:24
14.	"Breath Slow"	Terio	3:35
15.	"I Aint Neva Won"	The Colleagues	3:24
16.	"Let It Drop"	Tony Stone	5:21
17.	"Gods Father"	Moka Only	2:18
18.	"Be a Star"	Killah Kibba	2:09
19.	"Deep Ass Thoughts"	Bobby Music	3:50
20.	"Go Dumb Tonight"	James	2:13
21.	"Bitch Im Bussin"	On Ice	2:53
22.	"Glourious BasedGod"	Talen Ted	3:19
23.	"See Ya"	Aeon Flex; Certified Hitz	3:34
24.	"Flash"	Seedeeaaa	3:07
25.	"The Deal"		3:20
26.	"Pain"	BigBoyTraks	3:54
27.	"Secrete Obsession"	Merkabah 13	3:29
28.	"Turned Me Cold"	Clams Casino	3:40
29.	"Sf Mission Music"	AJ Rice	3:17
30.	"Im Just Livin"		3:21
31.	"Words Not Spoken"	Moka Only	3:51
32.	"Wake Up Mr Flowers 3mix"	Killah Kibba	2:42
33.	"Water Is Dmg"	Killah Kibba	2:35
34.	"I Love You"	Devon Hendryx	2:57
Total length:			117:09
