= Angels Exodus =

Studio album by Lil B
- Released: January 18, 2011
- Genre: Hip hop
- Length: 36:52
- Label: Amalgam Digital
- Producer: Bobby Music; Clams Casino; 9th Wonder

Lil B chronology
MM..Christmas (2010)	Angels Exodus (2011)	Red Flame: Devil Music Edition (2011)

Angels Exodus is the second solo studio album by the American rapper Lil B, released on January 18, 2011. Unlike Lil B's previous releases, which were often released for free download, Angels Exodus was distributed via digital purchase by Amalgam Digital. It is also shorter when compared to his previous releases, with a runtime of 37 minutes. A hip hop album, Angels Exodus sees Lil B deviating from his usual subject matter to deliver more serious and introspective lyrics. It is loosely built around a theme of Lil B fighting undead creatures, who serve as metaphors for people. Although Angels Exodus received mixed reviews, many critics considered it a display of Lil B's artistic growth.

== Background and release ==
After seeing success as a member of the Pack, Lil B embarked on a solo career in 2008. Over the following years, he regularly released mixtapes; in 2010, he released nine. In December 2010, independent label Amalgam Digital announced that it had signed Lil B to a deal. The label also announced that Lil B would be releasing two albums—Angels Exodus and Glass Face—with the former serving as a prelude to the latter. In a press release, Lil B stated:

We are putting out these two albums called Angels Exodus and then Glass Face. It’s going to be historical works of art with these albums. On Angels Exodus it’s going to be real hip-hop and sticking to the script. I’ll be going far outside of the boundaries and staying far away from the script too. The Glass Face album will live up to its name. These albums are something everyone will understand.

Angels Exodus was released through Amalgam Digital on January 18, 2011. It serves as Lil B's fourth album, and is his first to be recorded in a studio. Unlike most of his previous releases—which had been distributed for free download—Angels Exodus was released for digital purchase. Following its release, Lil B shared a self-directed and self-filmed music video for the track "Motivation". The album's cover art depicts Lil B as a martyr on a cross, draped in panties and with money in his pockets.

== Composition ==
Angels Exodus is a hip hop album. It consists of 12 tracks and has a runtime of 37 minutes, which is short when compared to Lil B's previous releases. On the album, Lil B strays from his usual subject matter, and delivers serious, introspective lyrics, while still retaining the humor of his previous releases. It is built on a loose concept of Lil B fighting the undead, with zombies, vampires, and other beings serving as metaphors for people. Sonically, Angels Exodus often incorporates reverb-heavy synthesizers.

On the opening track, "Exhibit 6", Lil B raps over a slow, dark instrumental, and shows appreciation for rapper Jay Electronica. The album's fifth song, "Motivation", features lyrics about how people who once criticized Lil B are now overly supportive of him. Its beat, which was produced by Clams Casino, is driven by a sample. On "Vampires", Lil B raps about transforming into a vampire over a happy-sounding instrumental. During its last 30 seconds, he repeats "don’t let the vampires get you", with a vocal inflection that critics compared to rappers Nicki Minaj and Biz Markie. The following track "More Silence More Coffins" as well as "The Growth" feature chipmunk soul production. The song "Connect the Dots" was produced by 9th Wonder and features a piano melody and an organ harmony.

== Critical reception ==
Professional ratings
Review scores
Source	Rating
Fact	3/5 stars
HipHopDX	2/5 stars
RapReviews	8/10
Tiny Mix Tapes	3.5/5 stars

Although Angels Exodus received mixed reviews, critics generally felt it showed mental and artistic growth from Lil B. Brian Richardson of Tiny Mix Tapes said he was surprised by Lil B's lyrical and rapping ability, and wrote that the album proved his potential. Richardson commented that Angels Exodus "plays more like a mixtape than an album", and said that some of the shorter songs felt like "unfinished sketches". Steve "Flash" Juon of RapReviews also praised the album, saying it benefited from its conciseness. In his retrospective review, Juon said that it comes close to being perfect, and wrote "It has the feeling of an album that he intended to be his legacy after he was gone."

Fact magazine's Chris Campbell and HipHopDX's Amanda Bassa were critical of Angels Exodus; Campbell felt it was worse when compared to Lil B's mixtapes. Bassa criticized the album, but commended Lil B's artistic growth. She concluded her review by writing "Even mass amounts of hype can’t cover up Lil B’s poorly mixed vocals, off-kilter methods of blending rapping with simply speaking, skewed perspective on life, and utter knack for taking what makes Rap great, and doing the exact opposite."

== Track listing ==
No.	Title	Length
1.	"Exhibit 6"	4:02
2.	"Life's Zombies"	3:20
3.	"All My Life (Remix)"	3:56
4.	"Bay Area Music"	2:44
5.	"Motivation"	3:40
6.	"Cold War, Pt. 2"	1:53
7.	"Vampires"	2:36
8.	"More Silence More Coffins"	3:00
9.	"Connect the Dots"	1:52
10.	"1 Time"	3:13
11.	"The Growth"	4:02
12.	"Frankie Silver"	2:28
Total length:		36:52
