= California Boy =

Single by Lil B
- Released: September 16, 2012
- Genre: Rock
- Length: 3:12
- Label: BasedWorld
- Songwriter: Brandon McCartney

Lil B singles chronology
"Im Like Killah" (2012)	"California Boy" (2012)	"Pretty Boy" (2013)

"California Boy" is a song by American rapper Lil B. It was released for digital download on September 16, 2012, through Lil B's own record label, BasedWorld Records. "California Boy" marks as Lil B's debut rock music release and was intended to be the title track of an upcoming rock album. The accompanying music video for the song was also released on September 17, 2012.

== Background and music ==
"California Boy" is a rock song and takes influences from various subgenres, including garage rock, surf-pop, college rock and soft rock. The song does not utilize rhyming and beats unlike Lil B's previous works in hip hop genre, opting for a guitar-based sound reminiscent of the style of indie rock acts such as Real Estate and Best Coast. The song also incorporates acoustic elements.

On the song, Lil B stated that he didn't use Autotune effect on his vocals, in reference to its extensive use on rapper Lil Wayne's rock music album, Rebirth (2010). Prior to the release of the song, Lil B claimed that he will be releasing a garage punk album, titled California Boy.

== Critical reception ==
The song generally received mixed to positive reviews from critics and was stylistically compared to Lil Wayne's Rebirth album and Kid Cudi's WZRD project. Chris Martins of Spin was optimistic on his review of the song, stating that "it is shaping up to be at least more promising than the unholy mess that was Wayne's Rebirth." Similarly, Fact magazine wrote: "Especially compared to Rebirth's horrid approximation of nu-metal, "California Boy" does quite a good job of capturing Lil B’s infectious earnestness." Phillip Mlynar of MTV Hive described the song as "a poppy-guitar groove that would fit seamlessly into a drive-time radio show." Ian S. Port of SF Weekly described the songs as "a parodic but somewhat credible acoustic-electric rock song that could stand in for a particularly tepid Goo Goo Dolls or Gin Blossoms B-side." Exclaim! writer Josiah Hughes criticized the song's style on the basis of Lil B's upcoming garage punk album, calling his understanding of garage punk as "a bad Hootie & the Blowfish song." Max Bell of LA Weekly panned the song, noting that "even his early advocate, Cocaine Blunt's Andrew Noz, dismissed the track." Tiny Mix Tapes assumed that "the song is sure to alienate even the most hardcore fans."

== Music video ==
The music video of the song was released on September 17, 2012. It features Lil B greeting fans at University of California, Berkeley, hanging out with a girl and performing the song with a backing band.

== Track listing ==
iTunes digital single

1. "California Boy" – 3:12
