= DatPiff =

Online music distribution platform

- Website type: Digital music
- Available in: English
- Founded: 2005
- Dissolved: 2023
- Headquarters: {{{location_country}}}
- Area served: Worldwide
- Owner: MediaLab AI Inc.
- Founder: Marcus Frasier
- Key people: Marcus Frasier (founder); Kyle "KP" Reilly (founder)
- Website: datpiff.com
- Registration: Optional
- Current status: Inactive

DatPiff was an online audio distribution platform specializing in hip-hop, rap, and urban music that launched in 2005. It was headquartered in Pennsylvania. The site was founded in the spring of 2005 by Marcus Frasier. It was owned by MediaLab. In March 2023, DatPiff experienced severe server outages. The following month, it announced that it had partnered with the Internet Archive to archive the site's music catalog. The site no longer hosts music but does link to the Internet Archive's collection. Despite this, the archived catalog completely disappeared from Internet Archive not long after its publication and has yet to be reuploaded officially by DatPiff, rendering only a small percentage of mixtapes from the platform available on Internet Archive.

== Features ==
A key feature of DatPiff was that unregistered users were allowed to download any mixtape uploaded to the site that has been sponsored. Registered users were permitted a limited number of downloads of non-sponsored mixtapes per day. Premium paid users had an unlimited number of downloads of any mixtape. Mixtapes could be streamed by any user. Premium content could also be purchased.

Users could register as either an artist or fan - the key difference being that artists upload their work to the site while fans may only listen to these works.

DatPiff had mobile applications for iOS (iPhone and iPad), Android, Windows Phone 7, BlackBerry, and WebOS.
