= 6 Kiss (album) =

Mixtape by Lil B
- Released: December 22, 2009
- Genres: West Coast hip-hop; cloud rap; frat rap; lo-fi
- Length: 87:46
- Labels: Permanent Marks; Basedworld
- Producers: Beat Flippaz; Carnage; Clams Casino; Cracka Lack; DecadeZ; DJ Paul; Emynd; Juicy J; Just Blaze; Keyboard Kid; Nanosaur; Nico Spring; Omega One; Squadda B; Trey G.

Lil B chronology
I'm Thraxx (2009)	6 Kiss (2009)	Paint (2010)

6 Kiss is the second solo mixtape by the American rapper Lil B. It was released on December 22, 2009, by Permanent Marks. It follows the release of his first solo mixtape I'm Thraxx that was released on September 24, 2009. The album cover was illustrated by Benjamin Marra, and depicts Lil B shirtless with a halo on his head. Clams Casino and Keyboard Kid are the primary producers of the album.

== Background ==
Prior to releasing 6 Kiss, Lil B was a member of American hip hop group the Pack. In 2006, the group's song "Vans" reached number 58 on the Billboard Hot 100. During 2008 and 2009, Lil B uploaded songs to Myspace, where he started to develop a cult-like underground following.

== Reception ==
6 Kiss received positive reviews; For instance, VICE lists 6 Kiss as one of Lil B's earliest proper releases and highlights how confident Lil B was in embracing "spaced-out textures and ... an innocent, optimistic viewpoint." They also say the beats on "I'm God" and "What You Doin'" were "ahead of their time."

Rolling Stone described 6 Kiss as "a generational dividing line in West Coast rap". The publication ranked the second track on the mixtape, "I'm God", at 37th on their 2023 list of "The 100 Greatest West Coast Hip-Hop Songs of All Time".

Soulja Boy, a prominent rapper, stated that one of his all-time favorite albums is 6 Kiss. Additionally, rappers including Kendrick Lamar and Tyler the Creator applauded his work and revolutionary style. Despite this, older rappers dismissed the mixtape as it strayed from traditional styles. Lil B has also faced criticism from fans for some materialistic and misogynistic lyrics.

== Influence ==
The release of 6 Kiss pioneered the cloud rap subgenre, which is known for ethereal sounds combined with melodic rapping. Many critics attribute 6 Kiss to be one of the most influential mixtapes of all time and say that it allowed for the success of many rappers, such as ASAP Rocky, Yung Lean, Playboi Carti, and Bladee. The instrumental of "I'm God" received a cult following on the Internet and is considered one of the most important cloud rap tracks.

== Track listing ==
All tracks are written by Brandon McCartney.

No.	Title	Producer(s)	Length
1.	"B.O.R. (Birth of Rap)"	Trey G.	3:56
2.	"I'm God"	Clams Casino	4:38
3.	"Walk the World"	Keyboard Kid	3:19
4.	"Beat the Odds"	Trey G.	3:27
5.	"Based"	Keyboard Kid	3:48
6.	"Real Plexxx"	Just Blaze	3:13
7.	"Rolls Royce"	Keyboard Kid	4:05
8.	"Let the Eagles Go"	Keyboard Kid	3:48
9.	"Ridin' 4 My Niggaz"	Nico Spring	3:13
10.	"Myspace"	Omega One	3:56
11.	"What I Mean"	Carnage	3:05
12.	"I Want Your Bitch"	Emynd	3:58
13.	"All Alone"	Squadda B	4:45
14.	"Pretty Bitch"	Beat Flippaz	4:39
15.	"Finna Hit a Lick"	DecadeZ	3:31
16.	"I'm the Devil"	Clams Casino	3:45
17.	"What You Doin'"	Clams Casino	4:21

Greatest Hits Bonus Singles
No.	Title	Producer(s)	Length
18.	"O My God 66"		4:07
19.	"I Got Bitches"	Nanosaur	6:53

Classic Based Freestyle Bonus Tracks
No.	Title	Producer(s)	Length
20.	"We Ridin' Scraper"		4:59
21.	"X-Men"	Cracka Lack	3:05
22.	"Smoke Trees Fxxx Hoes"	DJ Paul; Juicy J	3:15
Total length:			87:46
