= I'm Gay (I'm Happy) =

Studio album by Lil B
- Released: June 29, 2011
- Recorded: 2010–11
- Genre: Hip-hop
- Length: 44:00
- Label: Amalgam Digital
- Producer: BigBoyTraks; Caleb Mak; Clams Casino; Keyboard Kid; Lil B; Lou Pocus; Rick Flame; Supreme Jean; Talen Ted

Lil B chronology
Bitch Mob: Respect Da Bitch Vol. 1 (2011)	I'm Gay (I'm Happy) (2011)	I Forgive You (2011)

I'm Gay (I'm Happy) is the third studio album by the American rapper Lil B. The album was released digitally on June 29, 2011. On June 30, 2011, the rapper provided a free download link on his Twitter account. The album entered the Billboard's R&B/Hip-Hop Albums chart at number 56 and the Heatseekers Albums chart at number 20 for the week of July 16, 2011. The album's cover is an allusion to Marvin Gaye's 1976 album, I Want You.

== Background and title ==
Lil B announced the album and its title during his performance at the Coachella Festival in 2011. Shortly after the announcement, the rapper was met with backlash, even from his own fans. In MTV News, Lil B claimed he received death threats: "People been hitting me up like, 'I'm gonna bash your head in,' 'you faggot,' 'I'm gonna kill you', a lot of my supporters have turned on me. It's been a few supporters that's saying, 'I'm not gonna rock with you anymore'".

The title was met with controversy from the media as well as figures in the hip-hop community. Terrance Dean, former MTV executive and openly gay author of "Hiding In Hip-hop", stated, "I think that [announcement] was so much bigger than he was. That it was like seeing his future before it even actually happened". Openly gay BET blogger Lloyd "Gyant" Dinwiddie perceived the album name as a publicity stunt: "I don't want to take anything away from what I think he's trying to do. I really do feel that it is less about social evolution, and it's more about making a name for yourself and selling your project". GLAAD issued a statement addressing the album's title. "As a lyricist, Lil B knows that words matter. Slurs have the power to fuel intolerance. We hope that Lil B's album title is not just a gimmick, and is really a sincere attempt to be an ally". In response to the statement, Lil B told MTV "I got major love for the gay and lesbian community, and I just want to push less separation and that’s why I’m doing it. I hope GLAAD sees that I’m taking initial steps to break barriers."

== Critical reception ==
Professional ratings
Aggregate scores
Source	Rating
Metacritic	73/100
Review scores
Source	Rating
The A.V. Club	B−
The Boston Phoenix	3/4 stars
Consequence of Sound	3.5/5 stars
Drowned in Sound	6/10
Now	3/5
Pitchfork	8.1/10
Slant Magazine	3.5/5 stars
URB	3.5/5 stars
XXL	3/5

I'm Gay (I'm Happy) received positive reviews; fans commented on the album's wide variety of positive messages and also the unique beats and lyrical styles not common to mainstream hip-hop. Lil B rapped about many controversial issues in the album including race relations, poverty, humanity and the justice system. The album, according to many fans, shows the "true" side of Lil B, many noting the album's inspirational theme. I'm Gay received generally positive reviews from music critics. At Metacritic, which assigns a weighted mean rating out of 100 to reviews from mainstream critics, the album received an average score of 73, based on 10 reviews. Lil B was the subject of controversy because upon the album's release he decided to provide a free version via a download link on Facebook. Many believed this to be a publicity stunt; however, he cleared the controversy when on his Facebook page he posted: "for all my fans who don't have 10 dollars to buy my album, here it is for free."

=== Accolades ===
Publications' year-end list appearances for I'm Gay (I'm Happy)
Critic/Publication	List	Rank	Ref
Tiny Mix Tapes	Tiny Mix Tapes' Top 50 Albums of 2011	30	

== Track listing ==
No.	Title	Producer(s)	Length
1.	"Trapped in Prison"	Lou Pocus	4:00
2.	"Open Thunder Eternal Slumber"	Supreme Jean	2:47
3.	"Game"	BigBoyTraks	3:43
4.	"Unchain Me"	Clams Casino	3:54
5.	"Neva Stop Me"	Talen Ted	2:36
6.	"Gon Be Okay"	Caleb Mak	2:23
7.	"The Wilderness"	Rick Flame	3:29
8.	"I Hate Myself"	Keyboard Kid	5:45
9.	"Get It While It's Good"	Talen Ted	3:36
10.	"I Seen That Light"	BigBoyTraks	4:02
11.	"My Last Chance"	BigBoyTraks	4:04
12.	"1 Time Remix"	Clams Casino	4:00
Total length:			44:00

Sample credits

- "Trapped in Prison" contains a sample of "Leaving Shire" by Bo Hansson.
- "Open Thunder Eternal Slumber" contains a sample of "Catch the Breeze" by Slowdive.
- "Game" contains a sample of "Of All the Things" by Stephanie Mills
- "Unchain Me" contains a sample of "Cry Little Sister" by Gerard McMann.
- "Neva Stop Me" contains a sample of "Quasimodo's Marriage" by Alec R. Costandinos.
- "Gon Be Okay" contains a sample of "One Summer's Day" by Joe Hisaishi.
- "The Wilderness" contains a sample of "Futari Dake No Ceremony" by Yukiko Okada.
- "I Hate Myself" contains a sample of Boyz II Men's cover of "Iris" by Goo Goo Dolls.
- "Get It While It's Good" contains a sample of "Dreaming" by Bill Summers.
- "I Seen That Light" contains a sample of "Lost in Time" by Eric Benet.
- "My Last Chance" contains a sample of "Still Waiting" by Johnny Gill.

== Charts ==
Chart performance for I'm Gay (I'm Happy)
Chart (2011)	Peak position
US Heatseekers Albums (Billboard)	20
US Top R&B/Hip-Hop Albums (Billboard)	56
