= Lil B =

American rapper and record producer (born 1989)

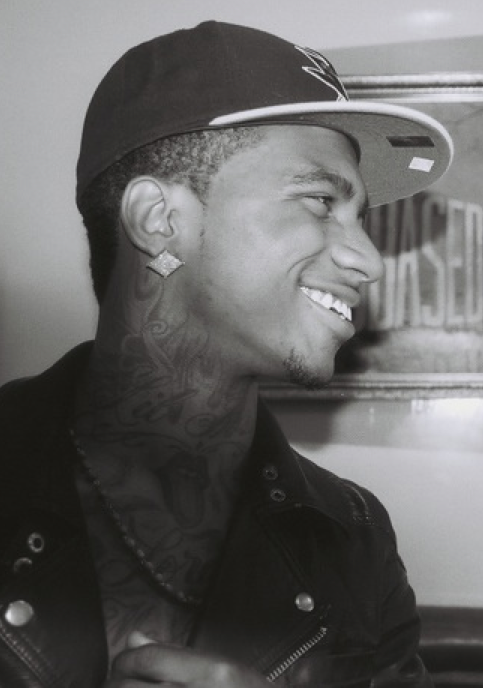
- Lil B in 2011

Background information
- Also known as: Lil B the BasedGod; The BasedGod; Lil Boss
- Born: Brandon Christopher McCartney; August 17, 1989 (age 37); Berkeley, California, U.S.
- Genres: West Coast hip hop; cloud rap; hyphy; new age
- Occupations: Rapper; songwriter; producer
- Works: Lil B discography
- Years active: 2004–present
- Labels: BasedWorld; Permanent Marks; Weird Forest; Stacks On Deck; Fool's Gold; Amalgam
- Formerly of: The Pack
- Website: basedworld.com

Brandon Christopher McCartney (born August 17, 1989), known professionally as Lil B and Lil B the BasedGod, is an American rapper and record producer. He began his career as a member of the Berkeley, California-based hip hop group the Pack in 2005, who signed with Too Short's Up All Nite Records, an imprint of Jive Records the following year. The group became best known for their hit song "Vans", their sole entry on the Billboard Hot 100, later releasing two studio albums before disbanding in 2010.

McCartney's extensive use of social media in his solo career and online persona has yielded a cult following. His work spans several genres, including comedy hip-hop, new age, jazz, indie rock and choral music. He calls his alter ego the BasedGod, and is credited with having coined the slang term "based", which originally denoted a lifestyle of positivity, impudence or boldness. By the late 2010s, the phrase had been used to describe stances or actions that negate political correctness; by the 2020s, the term had entered the mainstream and regained a neutral connotation.

Lil B has been credited as "the godfather of internet rap", a pioneer of the cloud rap subgenre, as well as one of the "most influential rappers" of the 2010s, influencing artists such as Kendrick Lamar, Playboi Carti, Young Thug, Lil Yachty, Chief Keef, Chance the Rapper, Yung Lean, Earl Sweatshirt, Black Kray, Bladee, Xaviersobased, and Tyler, the Creator, as well as actor Timothée Chalamet.

== Early life ==
Brandon Christopher McCartney was born on August 17, 1989, in Berkeley, California, and attended high school at Albany High in Albany. He adopted the name Lil B, and began rapping at age 15 with San Francisco Bay Area based hip hop group The Pack. After two locally successful mixtapes, at the peak of the Bay Area's hyphy movement, the group's song "Vans" became a surprise hit. The song was ranked as the fifth best of 2006 by Rolling Stone magazine. The strength of "Vans" led the group to release the Skateboards 2 Scrapers EP, featuring a "Vans" remix with Bay Area rappers Too $hort and Mistah F.A.B. In 2007, McCartney and The Pack released their first album, Based Boys.

== Career ==
=== 2009–2010: Solo success and collaborations ===
On September 24, 2009, McCartney released his first digital album, I'm Thraxx, via independent label Permanent Marks. On December 22, 2009, McCartney released his second digital album, 6 Kiss, to critical reception. On March 25, 2010, McCartney released his debut mixtape Dior Paint. On April 3, 2010, McCartney officially signed to fellow artist Soulja Boy's label SODMG Entertainment. On May 7, 2010, McCartney released a mixtape entitled Base World Pt. 1. On July 5, 2010, McCartney released a collaboration mixtape with Soulja Boy entitled Pretty Boy Millionaires. McCartney had recorded over 1,500 tracks as of July 2010, including hits "Like A Martian", "Wonton Soup", "Pretty Bitch", "I'm God", all of which were released for free. On September 21, 2010, McCartney released his debut studio album, Rain in England, through Weird Forest Records; it was described by The Guardian as "a beatless, Beat poetry-style set where McCartney, voice a-quiver with earnestness, ponders love, beauty and all the bad things in the world over naïf new-age synth washes".

=== 2010–present: Mixtapes ===
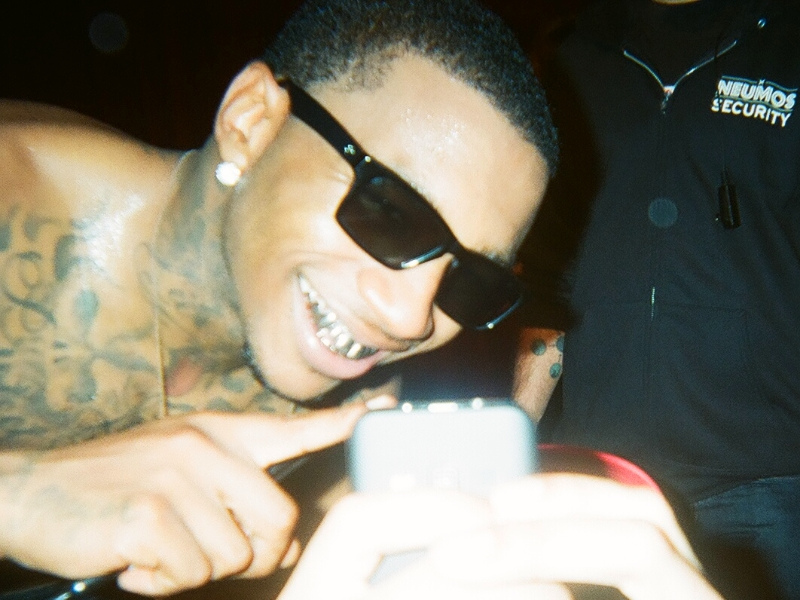
McCartney in 2012

On December 29, 2010, it was announced and confirmed that McCartney signed an album deal with Amalgam Digital. On July 10, 2011, McCartney released the EP Paint, through his label BasedWorld Records.

On January 18, 2011, McCartney released his fourth digital album entitled Angels Exodus, through Amalgam Digital. On April 14, 2011, McCartney announced that his next album would be entitled I'm Gay, which caused a degree of controversy. On June 29, 2011, McCartney released his fifth digital album, I'm Gay (I'm Happy), through Amalgam Digital; the album entered the Billboard R&B/Hip-Hop Albums chart at number 56 and the Heatseekers Albums chart at number 20 for the week of July 16, 2011.

On May 17, 2012, McCartney released his first instrumental album, Choices and Flowers, under the alias "The Basedgod". On September 16, 2012, McCartney released a rock single entitled "California Boy". On December 30, 2012, McCartney released his second instrumental album entitled Tears 4 God, also under the alias "The Basedgod".

On December 24, 2013, McCartney released the mixtape 05 Fuck Em, which contained 101 songs. On June 1, 2014, McCartney released a mixtape entitled Hoop Life, which would be known for containing a track entitled "F*ck KD" that called out NBA player Kevin Durant. On October 14, 2014, McCartney released the Ultimate Bitch mixtape, featuring the song "No Black Person Is Ugly."

On July 19, 2015, McCartney and Chance the Rapper announced that they had recorded a collaborative mixtape. It was released as Free (Based Freestyles Mixtape) on August 5. Later that year, on December 30, McCartney released the 63-track mixtape Thugged Out Pissed Off.

In 2017, McCartney was featured on Terror Jr's remix of their song "Come First".

On August 17, 2017, McCartney released Black Ken, describing it as his "first official mixtape." The mixtape reached number 24 on the Top Heatseekers chart and number 44 on the Independent Albums chart for the week of September 2, 2017.

In June 2022, McCartney released Frozen and The Frozen Tape. In August, he released Thraxxx Kiss, a collaboration with producer Keyboard Kid. McCartney released Afrikantis, a jazz album, on December 22, 2022.

== Artistry ==
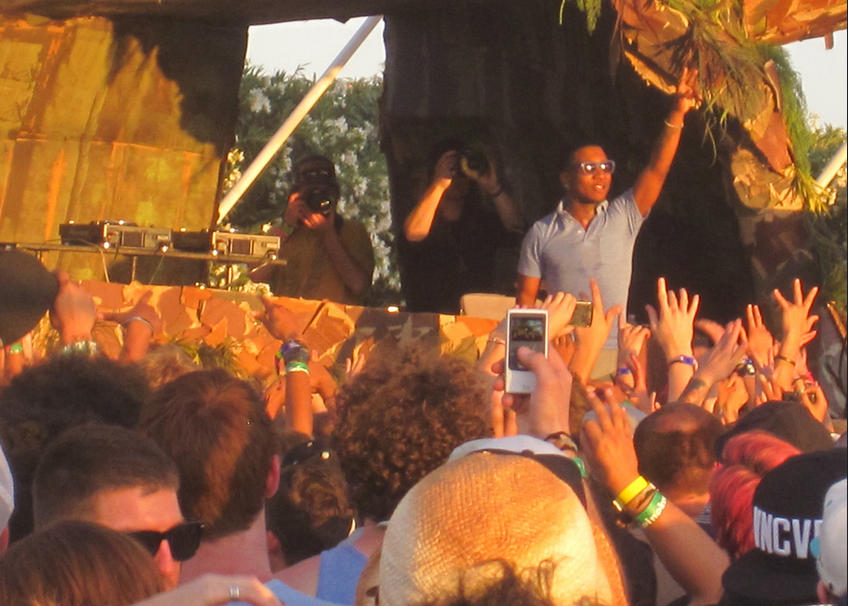
McCartney at Coachella music festival in 2011

=== Based ===
McCartney and music critics refer to his rapping style as "based", a word that McCartney also uses to describe a positive, bold lifestyle. "Based" is a reclaimed word, as described by McCartney in Complex:

Based means being yourself. Not being scared of what people think about you. Not being afraid to do what you wanna do. Being positive. When I was younger, based was a negative term that meant like dopehead, or basehead. People used to make fun of me. They was like, "You're based." They'd use it as a negative. And what I did was turn that negative into a positive. I started embracing it like, "Yeah, I'm based." I made it mine. I embedded it in my head. Based is positive.

=== Rapping technique ===
Slate columnist Jonah Weiner labeled him as one of a "growing number of weird-o emcees", calling him a "brilliantly warped, post-Lil Wayne deconstructionist from the Bay Area". Musical critic Willy Staley described McCartney's work as "variegated", because it ranges from critical parodies of the hip-hop genre to "half new age, half spoken word". He further notes that McCartney draws from a large variety of genres, especially those not commonly used by other rappers. In an interview with Staley, McCartney agrees with this analysis, saying, "I can do 'Swag OD' but then my favorite musical artist right now could be Antony and the Johnsons. That's the difference between me and these other rappers, and other musical artists in general."

== Other ventures ==
=== Author ===
Takin' Over by Imposing the Positive! is a book written by McCartney and published through Kele Publishing in 2009. The book is a collection of and written in the form of e-mails and text messages, and is written in such a way that the author is e-mailing the reader. Subjects include positivity, optimism, and living what he calls a "Based Lifestyle". The book was passed out in an unscripted NYU lecture in March 2012. On March 30, 2013, McCartney announced that he was in the process of writing his second book.

=== Motivational speaker ===
McCartney has given motivational lectures at several colleges, including MIT and Carnegie Mellon University. They are generally focused around his personal experience in life and current events. On May 28, 2015, the rapper gave a lecture at UCLA, where he touched on subjects like money, the media, technology, space, awareness, and love.

=== Basedmoji and vegEMOJI apps ===
McCartney launched the "Basedmoji" app on January 16, 2015. On January 17, 2015, McCartney released "vegEMOJI", in cooperation with vegan company "Follow Your Heart". Despite the fact that McCartney is not a vegan, he has stated that he is cutting down on his consumption of processed foods, and that he is "ashamed of eating meat".

== Personal life ==
On January 16, 2015, McCartney's apartment building in Contra Costa County, California, caught on fire early in the morning after an electrical fire spread through the building. McCartney and six other people were saved by 15-year-old Mateo Ysmael, who ran through the building to wake everyone up.

For the 2016 U.S. presidential election, he endorsed Vermont senator Bernie Sanders, citing his civil rights record.

McCartney has asked multiple women for pictures of their feet, hands, chests, and thighs, with "I love Lil B" written on it. In 2018, McCartney sent private Twitter messages to a 17-year-old, asking for pictures of her body with "I love Lil B" written on it, failing to ask for her age. Other young women came forward, saying they were asked for pictures to post on his Twitter and Instagram.

== Feuds ==
=== Joe Budden ===
In 2010, a number of exchanges between McCartney and Joe Budden were had over Twitter. Budden had been seeming to speak mockingly about McCartney's "Based" movement and his tweets, to which McCartney responded, initially friendly but then with insults. McCartney went on to release a diss track called "T Shirts & Buddens", which was then featured on his "Everything Based" mixtape. McCartney later apologized for his insults and noted his respect for Budden, calling him a "legend".

=== The Game ===
In 2011, after hearing a verse from McCartney on the Lil Wayne mixtape Sorry 4 the Wait, Compton rapper Game referred to McCartney as the "wackest rapper of all time." McCartney responded by calling Game "irrelevant," to which Game then threatened to knock out McCartney. Game targeted McCartney in his verse in his track "Martians vs Goblins" featuring Lil Wayne and Tyler, the Creator, with the line "Tie McCartney up to a tank full of propane, swag, now watch him cook". McCartney addressed this on his track "Tank of Propaine" on his "White Flame" mixtape. Several weeks later, the two settled their differences through Twitter after which McCartney urged fans to purchase Game's The R.E.D. Album.

=== Joey Bada$$ ===
McCartney took offense to the lyrics in the song "Survival Tactics" by late rapper Capital STEEZ, a founding member of the group Pro Era. In this, he raps, "They say hard work pays off / Well, tell the BasedGod don't quit his day job." McCartney responded with a song titled "I'm The Bada$$". Joey Bada$$ then responded with a song titled "Don't Quit Your Day Job!" When the feud became public on Twitter, Joey became a target of a lot of attacks from McCartney's fans, which ended up with Joey deleting his Twitter account, though restoring it later. In an interview with WWPR-FM, Joey Badass denied that he deleted his Twitter account because of McCartney's fans. Later, in an interview with VladTV, Joey admitted the feud was created for publicity, and admitted he's a fan of McCartney's more serious work.

=== Kevin Durant ===
In 2011, NBA superstar Kevin Durant tweeted his befuddlement with McCartney's popularity, and McCartney responded by "cursing" Durant that he would never win the NBA championship. The curse had been rescinded in 2012 but then reinstated in 2014. The feud between the two has simmered since then, resulting in McCartney releasing the diss track "Fuck KD" in 2014 and a commercial on NBA TV, where McCartney calls out Kevin Durant. McCartney has claimed the "curse of the Based God" to be responsible for Durant and his Oklahoma City Thunder team's loss to the Golden State Warriors in the Western Conference Finals of the 2016 NBA Playoffs. The Thunder had been up 3 games to 1 in a best-of-7 series, but then went on to lose the series in stunning fashion after losing the next 3 games in a row. On July 4, 2016, following the announcement of Durant leaving the Thunder for the Golden State Warriors, McCartney rescinded the curse again. Durant proceeded to win NBA Championships the following two years, in 2017 and 2018. In 2025, Lil B reignited his long-standing feud after the announcement that Durant was traded to the Houston Rockets.

=== James Harden ===
During the Western Conference Finals of the 2015 NBA Playoffs, McCartney began questioning NBA superstar James Harden's "cooking dance", a dance allegedly coined by McCartney which he had been doing all season long, and tweeted that if he doesn't receive an answer from Harden regarding that dance then Harden will receive the "Based God curse" similar to Kevin Durant. McCartney attributed the Houston Rockets loss to the Golden State Warriors with the score of 99–98 in Game 2, and again in Game 3 with the score of 115–80, to the curse. On May 24, 2015, McCartney announced on TMZ Sports that he has placed Harden under the "Based God curse" for the remainder of the playoffs and until further notice. On May 27, 2015, McCartney was present at Oracle Arena for Game 5 where the Warriors ultimately defeated the Rockets with the score of 104–90, becoming the Western Conference champions. Additionally, during this same game Harden set an NBA Playoff record of 13 turnovers, prompting McCartney to publicly consider lifting the curse. On June 4, 2017, McCartney announced on a live taping of First Take that he has lifted the curse from Harden.

=== A Boogie wit da Hoodie and PnB Rock ===
At the 2017 Rolling Loud Bay Area festival, McCartney was forced to cancel his set due to an alleged altercation with A Boogie wit da Hoodie backstage. Upon taking the stage to announce the cancellation of his set, he told the crowd he was attacked by "A Boogie and his whole crew" and that his equipment was also stolen, attributing the event to his criticism of New York hip hop in a recent Tweet. Footage of the altercation subsequently surfaced, and McCartney fans immediately expressed outrage on social media. Witnesses backstage also accused PnB Rock of being involved in the attack. Despite the incident, McCartney maintained a positive stance and even urged his supporters to forgive A Boogie later that day on Twitter.

The incident led to an immediate wave of support of McCartney from fans and other figures in the music industry. Schoolboy Q and Travis Scott, fellow performers at the festival, expressed their support for the rapper upon taking the stage for their respective sets. Other artists including Big Sean, Skepta, G-Eazy, 6lack, Kreayshawn, A-Trak, Alison Wonderland, SpaceGhostPurrp, Lupe Fiasco, Kaytranada, and Mike Dean also expressed their support of the rapper on social media. Amidst the fallout of the incident, PnB Rock was pulled from the festival's lineup and replaced by Kreayshawn. McCartney and A Boogie officially ended the feud two days later, through a phone call initiated by Kilo Curt of the late Mac Dre's Thizz Entertainment. Both artists took to Twitter to announce the end of the feud.

== Legacy and influence ==
Lil B has been credited as one of the "most influential rappers" of the 2010s, influencing artists such as Kendrick Lamar, Playboi Carti, Young Thug, Lil Yachty, Chief Keef, Chance the Rapper, Yung Lean, Earl Sweatshirt, Black Kray, Bladee, Xaviersobased and Tyler, the Creator, as well as actor Timothée Chalamet.

== Selected discography ==
- 6 Kiss (2009)
- Rain in England (2010)
- Angels Exodus (2011)
- I'm Gay (I'm Happy) (2011)
- Choices and Flowers (2012)
- Tears 4 God (2012)
