= Just for Now =

2005 song by Imogen Heap

Song by Imogen Heap

from the album Speak for Yourself
- Released: 18 July 2005
- Recorded: 2004
- Genre: Electronica, Ambient
- Length: 3:00
- Label: Megaphonic; RCA Victor
- Songwriter: Imogen Heap
- Producer: Imogen Heap

"Just for Now" is a song by English recording artist and producer Imogen Heap, from her second studio album, Speak for Yourself (2005). Written and produced by Heap, the song was originally written for the second-season episode of the television series The O.C. entitled "The Chrismukkah That Almost Wasn't", but was deemed too dark for the episode. "Just for Now" is an electronica song about a constant mayhem within a holiday environment, in which the singer sings to set aside the disarray for a short time of peace. Heap has performed the song in live performances, which she invites the audience to participate on it. "Just for Now" was covered by American recording artist Kelly Clarkson, for her sixth studio album Wrapped in Red (2013). Her version of the song, produced by Greg Kurstin, musically quotes the Christmas standard "Carol of the Bells" and was met with positive reviews. The song was also sampled in Clams Casino's composition "I'm God", featured on both Instrumentals and Lil B's 6 Kiss, and was covered by Pentatonix on their 2015 deluxe edition of their Christmas album That's Christmas to Me.

== Background and composition ==
"Just for Now" was written and produced by Imogen Heap in 2004, intending it to be used for the second second-season episode of the television series The O.C., entitled "The Chrismukkah That Almost Wasn't". But after completing it, the producers ultimately decided that the material was too dark, she cited: "though it was, I think, a little too dark for them. Not quite the toasted marshmallows they had in mind." Tracks such as "Hide and Seek" and Goodnight and Go were used on the series' other episodes and soundtracks instead. Heap then decided to record it for her second studio album, Speak for Yourself, which was released in 2005. "Just for Now" is an electronica song about a repeated chaos within a holiday environment, in which the singer sings to set aside the disarray for a short time of peace.

== Reception and live performances ==
Sean Ludwig of the university publication The Maneater wrote that "Just for Now" features just the right number of instruments and amount of emo-tinged lyrics, while The Boar's Daniel Mumby noted its similarities with "Hide and Seek". Ayo Jegede of Stylus Magazine wrote that the track "initially pulls in a different direction, mostly using an orchestral score as a backbone, but never quite reaches a fulfilling apex." Heap has also included it in her live performances, most notably the Glastonbury Festival. During the performance of the song, she also invites the audience to participate in it by dividing them into three parts to form a harmony. In a review of the live performance of the song, Laura Sinagra of The New York Times remarked that "The opening grand piano version of her ethereal "Just for Now" turned the album track's compressed "Get me out of here" refrain from what sounds in the recording like the cry of a trapped video game character into a more standard lover's lament."

== Kelly Clarkson version ==
"Just for Now"

Song by Kelly Clarkson

from the album Wrapped in Red
- Recorded: 2013
- Studio: Echo Recording Studios (Los Angeles, CA); Starstruck Studios (Nashville, TN)
- Genre: Christmas; pop
- Length: 3:30
- Label: RCA
- Songwriter: Imogen Heap
- Producer: Greg Kurstin

"Just for Now" was covered by American recording artist Kelly Clarkson for her sixth studio album, Wrapped in Red (2013). The song, produced by Greg Kurstin, contains a portion of the composition of the Christmas carol, "Carol of the Bells", whose lyrics were written by Peter J. Wilhousky.

=== Background ===
Keith Naftaly, Clarkson's A&R representative at RCA Records, pitched to her the idea of including "Just for Now" for her Christmas album, Wrapped in Red. Clarkson, who was familiar with the song and an admirer of Heap, never thought of recording it, but was nevertheless pleased with the prospect. In an interview on Billboard, she identified it as a literary device to describe her family's dysfunctional environment for years, saying "that was my family Christmas-highly dysfunctional, like, 'Can we just stop for like five minutes and have like a normal Christmas setting?'" She compared it to songs by Joni Mitchell, saying "it's kind of melancholy, but that's very me. I love the reality of that song, some people's Christmas are like that."

=== Critical reception ===
In his review for MTV, Brad Stern lauded Clarkson's version of "Just for Now" as the best surprise from Wrapped in Red, he wrote, "Kelly puts her melodic spin on the indie track and makes hectic holiday get-togethers sound so, so beautiful. Basically, Kelly sleighs." Alan Raible of ABC News wrote in his review, "Yes, that is a holiday song disguised in its original album's context, but Clarkson delivers it well. Such an inspired choice earns her some bonus points." Matt Casarino of PopMatters was equivocal, in which he praised her performance but wrote about the risk of covering it, "It’s a fantastic song, mature and self-aware, and Clarkson nails it, but the adult-alternative sound and complex, dysfunctional-family tale may be off-putting to those lulled by the abundance of fireside romance that precedes it." Sal Cinquemani of Slant Magazine noted that the song's reference to "that time of year" may have appeared to be the sole justification, lyrical or otherwise, for its inclusion.

=== Chart performance ===
Clarkson's cover is the only version of "Just for Now" to enter a Billboard chart, by entering the Holiday Digital Songs chart at number 35 on the week ending 16 November 2013.

Chart (2013)	Peak position
South Korea International Singles (GAON)	148
US Holiday Digital Songs (Billboard)	35
