= Mikky Ekko =

American singer and songwriter

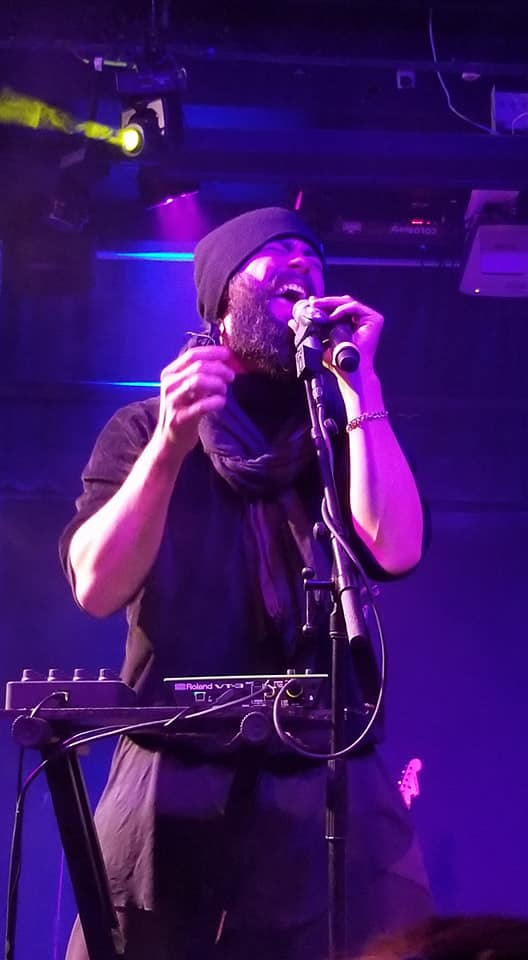
- Ekko performing in April 2018

Background information
- Born: John Stephen Sudduth; Shreveport, Louisiana, United States
- Occupations: Singer; songwriter; record producer
- Years active: 2008–present
- Labels: RCA; Interscope
- Website: www.mikkyekko.com

John Stephen Sudduth, known professionally as Mikky Ekko, is an American singer, songwriter and record producer from Nashville. He co-wrote and was featured on Rihanna's 2013 single "Stay", which charted in multiple countries, becoming his first-charting material. Ekko released his debut studio album, Time, in 2015 through RCA Records. Fame, his second album, was released in 2018 on Interscope Records.

== Early life ==
John Stephen Sudduth was born in Louisiana and is the son of a preacher. He eventually moved to Nashville, Tennessee to pursue a music career. He began working as a songwriter for other artists, but realized that he wanted to be a singer.

== Career ==
=== 2008–12: Career beginnings ===
In 2009, Sudduth partnered with producer Tim Lauer and engineer Dan Hansen to record an a cappella version of "Sedated", released under the name Mikky Ekko. That led to his first EP Strange Fruit, which released February 15, 2009. In September 2009, he toured with the Nashville-based collective group Ten Out of Tenn.

Lauer and Hansen collaborated with Ekko for his 2010 EPs, Reds and Blues. "Who Are You, Really?", one of the tracks from Reds, caught the attention of experimental hip hop producer Clams Casino. It was featured in no fewer than six TV series episodes (Teen Wolf, Ringer, Pretty Little Liars, True Blood, The Blacklist and Reign). The video for "Feels Like the End", his second official single, produced by Nick Ruth and Ekko, was released to YouTube on September 25, 2012, with the digital release following on September 25. "Pull Me Down", written and produced by Ekko and Casino, was released digitally on October 30, 2012. The official video was uploaded to YouTube on November 16, 2012. Ryan Hemsworth released a remix of the song to iTunes on December 7, 2012.

=== 2012–16: Breakthrough and Time ===
In November 2012, Ekko was featured on singer Rihanna's seventh studio album Unapologetic on the track "Stay", which became a single in 2013. The song, originally written by Ekko and English songwriter Justin Parker, charted in multiple countries, becoming Ekko's first-charting material. It gave Ekko his first entry on the UK Singles Chart, charting at number four, and on the US Billboard Hot 100 at three. The song charted in the top five of 19 countries, including in Australia, France, Germany, Ireland, New Zealand and Switzerland. It has sold an approximate 10 million copies globally, making it his best selling single. Ekko performed "Stay" together with Rihanna for the first time at the 2013 Grammy Awards on February 10, 2013. Mikael Wood of Los Angeles Times positively reviewed the performance and wrote that it was the most memorable moment of the night.

Ekko released his first official music video on February 6, 2013, for his third single "Pull Me Down" through his VEVO account. "Who Are You, Really?" was featured during the closing credits of HBO's season six premiere of "True Blood" on June 16, 2013. Ekko premiered the video for "Kids" through VEVO on July 8, 2013. It was released via iTunes on September 8, 2013. Ekko co-wrote the song "We Remain" for The Hunger Games: Catching Fire – Original Motion Picture Soundtrack, performed by Christina Aguilera.

Ekko's debut album was titled Time. In March 2015, the song "Smile" was used in the trailer for the teen drama Paper Towns. "Watch Me Rise" became an opening theme for the EFL Championship on Sky Sports. In April 2015, Ekko was picked as Elvis Duran's Artist of the Month and was featured on NBC's Today show hosted by Kathy Lee Gifford and Hoda Kotb and broadcast nationally where he gave a live performance of "Smile".

=== 2016–2018: Fame ===
In 2016, Ekko began working on his next project, entitled Fame. Produced by Jay Joyce, the album was recorded in Nashville. The album's first single, "Blood on the Surface", released October 13, 2017. Paper Magazine premiered the song on October 12, 2017, describing it as "synthy retro". "Light the Way", a second song, was released on October 20, 2017. Fame was released on November 2, 2018.

== Discography ==
=== Studio albums ===
Title	Album details
Time	Released: January 16, 2015; Label: RCA; Formats: CD, digital download
Fame	Released: November 2, 2018; Label: Interscope; Formats: CD, digital download

=== Extended plays ===
Title	Details
Strange Fruit	Release: February 15, 2009; Format: Digital download; Label: Catapult
Reds	Release: June 29, 2010; Format: Digital download; Label: Colour and Sound Collective
Blues	Release: December 14, 2010; Format: Digital download; Label: Colour and Sound Collective
Tracks	Release: February 8, 2013; Format: Digital download; Label: RCA
Advance Copy	Release: March 2, 2018 (Note: Re-released on April 6, 2018.); Format: Digital download; Label: Interscope

=== Singles ===
==== As lead artist ====
Date	Title	Album
2012	"We Must Be Killers"	Non-album single
2012	"Feels Like the End"	Tracks
2012	"Pull Me Down" (Note: This song also appears on Ekko's Time album.)	Tracks
2013	"Kids"	Non-album single
2014	"Smile"	Time
2015	"Watch Me Rise"	Time
2017	"Blood on the Surface"	Fame
2017	"Light the Way"	Fame
2018	"Not the One"	Fame
2018	"Moment"	Fame
2018	"What's It Like Now"	Fame

==== Promotional singles ====
Date	Title	Album
2014	"Mourning Doves"	Time
2014	"Time"	Time
2015	"U"	Time
2018	"Cherish You"	Fame

==== Songwriting/production credits ====
Writer/Production/Featured Artist Credits
Year	Title	Artist	Album				
Year	Title	Artist	Album	Writer	Producer	Feat / Vocalist	Vocal Producer
2012	"Paint It Red"	Two Inch Punch	Non-album single	x		x	
2013	"Stay"	Rihanna (feat Mikky Ekko)	Unapologetic	x	x	x	x
2013	"We Remain"	Christina Aguilera	Hunger Games Catching Fire Soundtrack	x			
2014	"Stranger"	Chris Malinchak (feat Mikky Ekko)	Non-album single	x		x	
2015	"Don't Let Go"	Giorgio Moroder (feat Mikky Ekko)	Déjà Vu	x		x	
2015	"Surf"	Vince Staples	Summertime '06	x	x		
2016	"Be Somebody"	Clams Casino (feat. A$AP Rocky & Lil B)	32 Levels	x			
2016	"Into The Fire"	Clams Casino (feat Mikky Ekko)	32 Levels	x	x	x	x
2016	"Blast"	Clams Casino	32 Levels	x			
2016	"Claim My Love"	Jarryd James	High	x	x		
2017	"Sideline"	Niia	I	x			
2018	"Break Me Down"	Steve Angello	Human	x		x	
2018	"Black Tux, White Collar"	A$AP Rocky	Testing	x	x		
2018	"Where We Start"	Vance Joy	Nation of Two	x			
2019	"Days in the East"	Drake	Care Package	x			
2019	"Beyond the Pale"	Cold War Kids	New Age Norms 1	x			
2020	"Drown"	Martin Garrix (feat Clinton Kane)	Non-album single	x			
2020	"Promised Land"	Future Utopia (feat Mikky Ekko)	12 Questions	x	x	x	x
2020	"Fear or Faith Pt 2"	Future Utopia (feat Idris Elba)	12 Questions	x	x		
2020	MMXX - III	Diplo (feat Mikky Ekko)	MMXX	x	x	x	x
2020	MMXX - IX	Diplo (feat Mikky Ekko)	MMXX	x	x	x	x
2021	"Breaks My Back"	Meg Myers	Non-album single	x			
2021	"Lovesick"	Maroon 5	Jordi	x	x		
2022	"Cry On Me"	Ella Henderson (feat Mikky Ekko)	Everything I Didn't Say	x		x	
2022	"Collider Particles"	Madison Cunningham	Revealer	x			
2022	"Coast"	Hailee Steinfeld (feat Anderson .Paak)		x			
2022	"Before We Panic"	TOBi (feat Mikky Ekko)		x		x	x
2023	"Fire Sign"	TRY (feat Mikky Ekko)		x		x	x
2023	"Last Breath"	Ari Abdul	CCTV	x	x		
2023	"Long Way To Go"	Pink feat The Lumineers	Trustfall	x			
2023	"I Don't Wanna Be Like You"	Ruel	4th Wall	x			
2023	"Set Yourself On Fire"	Ruel	4th Wall	x			
2023	"In Pieces"	Chloe Bailey	In Pieces	x	x		
2023	"The Hardest Part"	Olivia Dean (feat Leon Bridges)					x
2023	"How Do I Love Again"	Rowan Drake	Dear Ella	x			
2023	"Lose Control"	Teddy Swims	I've Tried Everything But Therapy (Part 1)	x			
2023	"The Door"	Teddy Swims	I've Tried Everything But Therapy (Part 1)	x			
2023	"Suitcase"	Teddy Swims	I've Tried Everything But Therapy (Part 1)	x			
2023	"Bad Tattoo"	Cannons	Heartbeat Highway	x			
2023	"Devastation"	X Ambassadors w/ Pame		x			
2023	"Set It On Fire"	Jenny Owens Young	Avalanche	x			
2023	"Biting My Tongue"	Duncan Laurence	Skyboy	x			
2023	"Growing Up Is Hard"	Chelsea Cutler	Stellaria	x			
2023	"Drain Me"	Towa Bird	American Hero	x			x
2023	"Looking For"	Brenn!		x			
2024	"World Brand New"	Bowen Young	Us	x			
2024	"Red Sky"	21 Savage	American Dream	x		x	x
2024	"Spokane, Washington"	Benjamin Francis Leftwich	Some Things Break	x	x		
2024	"Lesson Learned"	Matt Hansen		x			
2024	"Hammer To The Heart"	Teddy Swims	I've Tried Everything But Therapy (Pt 1.5)	x			
2024	"Victory Garden"	The Lone Bellow		x			
2024	"To The Bone"	Bowen Young	Us	x	x		
2024	"UFO"	Smith and Thell		x			
2024	"Let Go"	Kygo (feat Sasha Sloan)	KYGO	x			
2024	"Blame"	Lucky Daye (feat Teddy Swims)	Algorithm	x			
2024	"Funeral"	Teddy Swims		x			
2024	"Big Love"	Suki Waterhouse	Memoir of a Sparklemuffin	x			
2024	"Bad Dreams"	Teddy Swims	I've Tried Everything But Therapy (Part 2)	x			
2024	"The End"	Bilmuri	American Motorsport (420cc Edition)	x			
2024	"Too Late"	Bilmuri	American Motorsport (420cc Edition)	x			
2024	"Human"	Marc Scibilia	More To This	x			
2024	"Dark Room"	A Calmer Place		x	x		
2024	"Memory Of A Day"	Phantogram	Memory of a Day	x			
2024	"I Wanna Know"	Phantogram	Memory of a Day	x			
2024	"Attaway"	Phantogram	Memory of a Day	x			
2024	"Pushing Daisies	Ashe feat Suki Waterhouse		x			
2025	"Not Your Man"	Teddy Swims	I've Tried Everything But Therapy (Pt 2)	x			
2025	"Funeral"	Teddy Swims	I've Tried Everything But Therapy (Pt 2)	x			
2025	"You're Kind of Crazy"	Teddy Swims	I've Tried Everything But Therapy (Pt 2)	x			
2025	"Bad Dream"	Teddy Swims	I've Tried Everything But Therapy (Pt 2)	x			
2025	"Black & White"	Teddy Swims feat Muni Long	I've Tried Everything But Therapy (Pt 2)	x			
2025	"If You Ever Change Your Mind"	Teddy Swims	I've Tried Everything But Therapy (Pt 2)	x			
2025	"Hammer To The Heart"	Teddy Swims	I've Tried Everything But Therapy (Pt 2)	x			
2025	"Shine A Light Inside"	Joshua Radin	One Day Home	x			
2025	"You're Not The One"	Mike Posner	The Beginning	x			
2025	"Don't Wanna Cry"	Selena Gomez & Benny Blanco	I Said I Love You First	x			
2025	"How Does It Feel To Be Forgotten"	Selena Gomez & Benny Blanco	I Said I Love You First	x			
2025	"Don't Take It Personally"	Selena Gomez & Benny Blanco	I Said I Love You First	x			
2025	"Talk"	Selena Gomez & Benny Blanco	I Said I Love You First	x			
2025	"A New Pair of Eyes"	Eyedress	Stoner	x			
2025	"I Wanna Move to Brooklyn"	JP Saxe	Articulate Excuses	x			
2025	"Free Drugs"	Teddy Swims	I've Tried Everything But Therapy - Complete Edition	x			
2025	"Dancing With Your Ghost"	Teddy Swims	I've Tried Everything But Therapy - Complete Edition	x			
2025	"Apple Tree"	Noah Cyrus	I Want My Loved Ones To Go With Me	x			
2025	"I Can't Lose"	Jonas Brothers	Greetings From Your Hometown	x			
2025	"give me a break!"	Michael Clifford feat. waterparks	SIDEQUEST	x			
2025	"The Feeling Never Went Away"	Sam Ryder	Heartland	x			
2025	"Ain't Dead Yet"	Sam Barber	Music For The Soul	x			
2025	"Shy"	Reneé Rapp	Bite Me	x			
2025	"I Think I Like You Better When You're Gone"	Reneé Rapp	Bite Me	x			
2025	"You'd Like That Wouldn't You"	Reneé Rapp	Bite Me	x			
2025	"Orphan"	Kenny Hoopla	Orphan	x			
2025	"Do You Still Love Me"	Obed Padilla		x			
2025	"Waves"	Blk Odyssy		x	x		
2025	"50K"	Obed Padilla		x			
2025	"Stay (If You Wanna Dance)"	Myles Smith		x			
2025	"Heartbreak"	Blk Odyssy		x	x		
2025	"Eyes Closed"	Jisoo feat Zayn		x			
2025	"APOLOGIZE"	BLK ODYSSY	MOOD CONTROL	x	x		
2025	"I'll Find You"	5 Seconds of Summer	Everyone's a Star!	x			
2025	"Keep Smiling"	Celeste	Woman of Faces	x			
2025	"587"	Kelsea Ballerini	Mount Pleasant Commentary	x			
2025	"Earthshaker"	Phantogram	Non-album single	x			
2025	"In My Head"	Phantogram (with Whethan)	Non-album single	x			
2025	"Bully"	Jonas Brothers	Greetings From Your Hometown	x			
2025	"Bleed Me Slow"	Bryant Barnes	Solace	x			
2025	"Don't Say"	Bryant Barnes	Solace	x			
2025	"Last Year"	Bryant Barnes	Solace	x			
2026	"Refuge"	Dermot Kennedy	The Weight Of The Woods	x			
2026	"RAINFOREST"	Obed Padilla	RODEO CLOWN - ACT I - EP	x			
2026	"ONE NIGHT"	Obed Padilla	RODEO CLOWN - ACT I - EP	x			
2026	"Lose That Light"	Loreen feat. 6lack	Wildfire	x			
2026	"White Noise"	Holly Humberstone	Cruel World	x			
2026	"HONEST"	Bilmuri	Kinda Hard	x			
2026	"SHYT FYST"	Bilmuri	Kinda Hard	x			
2026	"Nursat"	Zayn	Konnakol	x			
2026	"Betting Folk"	Zayn	Konnakol	x			
2026	"Used to the Blues"	Zayn	Konnakol	x			
2026	"5th Element"	Zayn	Konnakol	x			
2026	"Prayers"	Zayn	Konnakol	x			
2026	"Fatal"	Zayn	Konnakol	x			
2026	"Take Turns"	Zayn	Konnakol	x			
2026	"Like I Have You"	Zayn	Konnakol	x			
2026	"Loving The Way I Do"	Zayn	Konnakol	x			
2026	"Breathe"	Zayn	Konnakol	x			
2026	"Nothing Like Being In Love"	Maisie Peters	Florescence	x			
2026	"Knowing What I Know Now"	ClockClock	Out Of The Dark EP	x			
2026	"Handle"	Ravyn Lenae	Blue Island	x			
2026	"Codeine"	Gabriella Rose	I Just Wanna Be Loved	x			
