= Time (Mikky Ekko album) =

Studio album by Mikky Ekko
- Released: January 16, 2015
- Genre: Pop
- Length: 47:50
- Label: RCA
- Producers: A.C.; Blood Diamonds; Jeff Bhasker; Benny Blanco; Clams Casino; Mikky Ekko; Tyler Johnson; Elof Loelv; Eric Masse; Justin Parker; Nick Ruth; Alex Salibian; David Andrew Sitek; Fraser T Smith; Stargate; Ryan Tedder; Noel Zancanella

Mikky Ekko chronology
Time (2015)	Fame (2018)

Singles from Time
- 1. "Pull Me Down" Released: October 30, 2012; 2. "Smile" Released: August 15, 2014; 3. "Watch Me Rise" Released: May 8, 2015

Professional ratings
Aggregate scores
Source	Rating
Metacritic	59/100
Review scores
Source	Rating
AllMusic	3.5/5 stars
The New Zealand Herald	3.5/5 stars
Pitchfork	4.3/10
PopMatters	6/10 discs
Rolling Stone	(US) (AUS)
Under the Radar	6/10 stars

Time is the debut studio album by American singer Mikky Ekko. The album was released worldwide on January 16, 2015, by RCA Records, except for the United States where it was released on January 20.

== Background ==
Mikky Ekko rose to fame with his 2013 Rihanna collaboration "Stay". Following the release of "Stay", RCA Records wanted to capitalize on its success, said Mikky Ekko: "From the label, people on Rihanna's side. I think we speculated a little bit about going out on the tour with Rih, and I ultimately felt like the songs weren't there. And I said I'm not gonna go out to promote an album that could be better. And I know the sort of the endless tweaking that can happen, but I feel like we took the time to put together a really, really strong album full of songs that at least for me represents exactly where I am."

== Critical reception ==
At Metacritic, which assigns a weighted average score out of 100 to reviews from mainstream critics, Time received an average score of 59% based on 5 reviews, indicating "mixed or average reviews".

== Track listing ==
No.	Title	Writer(s)	Producer(s)	Length
1.	"Watch Me Rise"	Mikky Ekko; Benjamin Levin; Tor Erik Hermansen; Mikkel S. Eriksen; Steven Weston	Benny Blanco; Stargate; Ekko^{[a]}	4:04
2.	"Smile"	Mikky Ekko; Greg Kurstin; Jim Eliot; Dennis Herring	Ekko; Elof Loelv	3:27
3.	"Love You Crazy"	Mikky Ekko; Ryan Tedder; Noel Zancanella	Tedder; Zancanella; Ekko^{[a]}	3:12
4.	"U"	Mikky Ekko; Blood Diamonds	Blood Diamonds	3:57
5.	"Time"	Mikky Ekko; Fraser T Smith	Smith; Eric Masse^{[a]}	4:14
6.	"Riot"	Mikky Ekko; Boots Ottestad	David Andrew Sitek; Herring^{[a]}	4:23
7.	"Mourning Doves"	Mikky Ekko; Elof Loelv	Loelv; Ekko	4:18
8.	"Burning Doves"	Mikky Ekko; Jeff Bhasker	Bhasker; Tyler Johnson^{[b]}; Alex Salibian^{[a]}	4:41
9.	"Comatose"	Mikky Ekko; Justin Parker; Michael Volpe	Parker; Clams Casino; Ekko	3:47
10.	"Pull Me Down"	Mikky Ekko; Michael Volpe	Clams Casino; Ekko	3:27
11.	"Made of Light"	Mikky Ekko; Nick Ruth; Alexander Castillo Vasquez	Ruth; A.C.	4:16
12.	"Loner"	Mikky Ekko; Ryan Tedder; Noel Zancanella	Tedder; Zancanella; Ekko^{[a]}	4:04
13.	"Pressure Pills*^{^{[c]}}"	Mikky Ekko; Clams Casino	Steven Weston; Ekko^{[a]}	3:39
14.	"Pretend You Care^{[c]}"	Mikky Ekko; Cubby	Eric Masse^{[b]}; Kevin Dailey^{[b]}; Steven Weston^{[b]}	3:16
15.	"Stay" (demo version^{[c]})	Mikky Ekko; Justin Parker	Mikky Ekko; Justin Parker	4:04

Notes

- ^{^[a]} signifies an additional producer
- ^{^[b]} signifies a co-producer
- ^{^[c]} signifies a bonus track on certain editions

== Personnel ==
Musicians

- Mikky Ekko – vocals (all tracks), strings (7)
- Greg Kurstin – guitar, keyboards, programming (2)
- Elof Loelv – programming (2)
- Ryan Tedder – background vocals, piano (3)
- Noel Zancanella – programming (3)
- Jason Lehning – bass (5)
- Claire Indie Nunn – cello (5)
- Rayland Baxter – guitar (5)
- Fraser T. Smith – strings (5)
- Eleondore Denig – violin (5)
- Davey Faragher – bass (6)
- Josh Freese – drums (6)
- Jake Orrall – guitar (6)
- Doug Showalter – acoustic guitar (8)
- Jeff Bhasker – guitar, keyboards (8)
- Trinity Seenath – shaker (8)
- John Paul Roney – guitar (10)
- Eric Hillman – guitar (12)

Technical

- Chris Athens – mastering
- Mark Stent – mixing (1, 3, 5, 7, 9, 11, 12)
- Tom Elmhirst – mixing (2, 6, 10)
- Blood Diamonds – mixing, engineering (4)
- Jon Castelli – mixing (8)
- Elof Loelv – engineering (2, 7)
- Noel Zancanella – engineering (3, 11)
- Ryan Tedder – engineering (3, 11)
- Eric Masse – engineering, recording (5)
- Alex Salibian – engineering (8)
- Tyler Sam Johnson – engineering (8)
- Dave Way – engineering (6)
- Dennis Herring – engineering (6)
- Zeph Sowers – engineering (6)
- Chris Sclafani – engineering (9)
- Clams Casino – engineering (9), recording (10)
- Justin Parker – engineering (9)
- Nick Ruth – engineering (11)
- Graham Archer – recording (5)
- Mikky Ekko – recording (10)
- Geoff Swan – engineering assistance (1, 3, 5, 7, 9, 11)
- Matty Green – engineering assistance (1, 3, 5, 7, 9, 11)
- Ben Baptie – engineering assistance (2, 6, 10)
- Joe Visciano – engineering assistance (2, 6, 10)
- Ryan Nasci – engineering assistance (8)

Artwork

- Erwin Gorostiza – creative direction
- Alexis Copeland – design
- Gareth Fewel – design
- Jason White – design
- Leviathan – design
- Eliot Lee Hazel – photography

== Charts ==
Chart (2015)	Peak position
US Heatseekers Albums (Billboard)	6
US Top Alternative Albums (Billboard)	24
