= We Remain =

Single by Christina Aguilera

from the album The Hunger Games: Catching Fire – Original Motion Picture Soundtrack
- Released: October 1, 2013
- Recorded: 2013
- Studio: Optimus Prime (Coeur d'Alene, ID); Sonikwire Studios (Irvine, CA); NightBird Recording Studios (West Hollywood, CA)
- Genre: Arena pop
- Length: 4:00
- Label: RCA; Republic; Lionsgate
- Songwriters: Ryan Tedder; Brent Kutzle; Mikky Ekko
- Producers: Ryan Tedder; Brent Kutzle

Christina Aguilera singles chronology
"Say Something" (2013)	"We Remain" (2013)	"Change" (2016)

The Hunger Games singles chronology
"Elastic Heart" (2013)	"We Remain" (2013)	"Yellow Flicker Beat" (2014)

Audio video
- "We Remain" on YouTube

"We Remain" is a song by American singer Christina Aguilera, taken from The Hunger Games: Catching Fire – Original Motion Picture Soundtrack, the soundtrack to the 2013 American science-fiction adventure film The Hunger Games: Catching Fire. It was released as the third single from the soundtrack on October 1, 2013, following Coldplay's "Atlas" and Sia's "Elastic Heart". Composed by Ryan Tedder, Brent Kutzle and Mikky Ekko, "We Remain" is an arena pop power ballad about perseverance. Contemporary music critics lauded the song for its sound and picked it as one of the highlights from the soundtrack. The single appeared on a few national record charts including Belgium, South Korea and the United Kingdom.

== Background ==
Following the release of her seventh studio album, Lotus (2012), which spawned two singles "Your Body" and "Just a Fool", Aguilera was reported to be featured on the soundtrack for The Hunger Games: Catching Fire Original Motion Picture Soundtrack with a song called "We Remain" in September 2013. On September 25, 2013, Aguilera unveiled a 90-second preview of the track.

== Composition ==
"We Remain"
A 25-second sample of "We Remain"

"We Remain" was written by Ryan Tedder and Brent Kutzle of OneRepublic, and Mikky Ekko. The song is a midtempo arena pop power ballad. It lasts for a duration of 4:00 (four minutes). Aguilera sings with "enormous" and "soaring" vocals on a "propulsive Ryan Tedder-ish beat" background. "We Remain" incorporates a smooth piano and drum machine in its instrumentation. According to Billboard magazine, the ballad "finds [Aguilera] tamping down [...] for a natural and forceful message of perseverance". At the chorus, Aguilera sings "So burn me with fire/ Drown me with rain/ I'm gonna wake up screaming your name/ Yes I'm a sinner, yes I'm a saint/ whatever happens here, whatever happens here, we remain". Several critics compared "We Remain" to Aguilera's previous hit "Beautiful" (2002) and Alicia Keys' "Girl on Fire" (2012) for musical similarities.

== Release history ==
The song was released as the third single from the soundtrack, following "Atlas" by Coldplay and "Elastic Heart" by Sia. It was released as a digital download single at Amazon.com on October 1, 2013. It was also released on the iTunes Stores on the same day. On October 8, "We Remain" impacted US contemporary hit radio. Aguilera performed "We Remain" live with her contestant Jacquie Lee during the season finale of the fifth season of The Voice on December 17, 2013. A studio version of the duet was released on the US iTunes Store on December 16, 2013.

== Critical reception ==
Ryan Reed from Rolling Stone magazine praised the "triumphant sounding" track "sure to be a hit at District 12 radio". An editor from The Huffington Post picked "We Remain" as one of the standout tracks from the soundtrack that "encapsulates the spirit and power of Games' heroine, Katniss". Brett Malec of E! simply called it "a beautiful track", while a staff writer from Billboard named it a "triumphant" song. While reviewing the soundtrack for The Hunger Games: Catching Fire, Alex Young from Consequence of Sound selected "We Remain" as one of the highlights from the album, which made Aguilera "the biggest star on display". Entertainment Weekly writer Nick Catucci picked it as one of the best tracks, calling it "an awesome reminder of Christina's power" and "one of the most righteous doses of uplift this year, on any platform".

== Personnel ==
Credits adapted from The Hunger Games: Catching Fire soundtrack digital inlay cover

- Songwriting – Brent Kutzle, Mikky Ekko, Ryan Tedder
- Producing – Brent Kutzle, Ryan Tedder
- Guitar – Aaron Andersen
- Piano – Ryan Tedder
- Strings, bass, drums, piano – Brent Kutzle
- Mixing – Joe Zook
- Assistant mixing – Ryan Lipman
- Mastering – Brian "Big Bass" Gardner
- Engineering – Alex Bush, Bryan Cook, Stuart Schenk
- Assistant engineering – Angelo Caputo

== Charts ==
"We Remain" peaked at number 58 on the South Korean Gaon International Download Chart with 2,689 copies sold on October 6, 2013. The single also peaked at number 31 on the Belgian Flanders Singles Chart and number 14 on the Belgian Wallonian Singles Chart.

Chart (2013)	Peak position
Australia (ARIA)	177
Belgium (Ultratip Bubbling Under Flanders)	31
Belgium (Ultratip Bubbling Under Wallonia)	14
Italy (FIMI)	101
South Korea (GAON Download Chart)	58
UK Singles (Official Charts Company)	144
US Digital Song Sales (Billboard)	64

== Release history ==
Country	Date	Format	Label(s)	Ref.
Belgium	October 1, 2013	Digital download	Universal Music Group	
Finland	October 1, 2013	Digital download	Universal Music Group	
France	October 1, 2013	Digital download	Universal Music Group	
Germany	October 1, 2013	Digital download	RCA; Republic	
New Zealand	October 1, 2013	Digital download	Universal Music Group	
Switzerland	October 1, 2013	Digital download	Universal Music Group	
United States	October 1, 2013	Digital download	RCA; Republic	
Australia	October 2, 2013	Digital download	Universal Music Australia	
United States	October 8, 2013	Contemporary hit radio	RCA; Republic; Lionsgate	
United States	December 16, 2013	Digital download (Note: Live from The Voice version)	Republic	
