= Moon Trip Radio =

Studio album by Clams Casino
- Released: November 7, 2019
- Length: 30:20
- Label: Clams Casino Productions
- Producer: Michael Volpe

Clams Casino chronology
Spider Web (2018)	Moon Trip Radio (2019)	Instrumental Relics (2020)

Singles from Moon Trip Radio
- 1. "Rune" Released: October 29, 2019

Professional ratings
Review scores
Source	Rating
NME	2/5 stars
Pitchfork	7.7/10

Moon Trip Radio is the second studio album by American musician Clams Casino. It was released on November 7, 2019 through Clams Casino Productions. It had been announced in October, with the release of a single, "Rune". Each track was accompanied by a visualizer.

== Track listing ==
All tracks are written by Michael Volpe.

Moon Trip Radio track listing
No.	Title	Length
1.	"Rune"	3:29
2.	"Healing"	2:29
3.	"NSX"	3:12
4.	"Cupidwing"	3:22
5.	"Glowing Bones"	3:01
6.	"Fire Blue"	1:42
7.	"Twilit"	2:28
8.	"Lyre"	3:20
9.	"In a Mirror"	2:45
10.	"Soliloquy"	1:23
11.	"Moon Trip Radio"	3:09
Total length:		30:20
