= The Hunger Games: Catching Fire =

2013 film by Francis Lawrence

- Theatrical release poster
- Directed by: Francis Lawrence
- Screenplay by: Simon Beaufoy; Michael deBruyn
- Based on: Catching Fire by Suzanne Collins
- Produced by: Nina Jacobson; Jon Kilik
- Starring: Jennifer Lawrence; Josh Hutcherson; Liam Hemsworth; Woody Harrelson; Elizabeth Banks; Lenny Kravitz; Philip Seymour Hoffman; Jeffrey Wright; Stanley Tucci; Donald Sutherland
- Cinematography: Jo Willems
- Edited by: Alan Edward Bell
- Music by: James Newton Howard
- Production companies: Lionsgate; Color Force
- Distributed by: Lionsgate
- Release dates: November 11, 2013 (Odeon Leicester Square); November 22, 2013 (United States)
- Running time: 146 minutes
- Country: United States
- Language: English
- Budget: $130–140 million
- Box office: $869.9 million

The Hunger Games: Catching Fire is a 2013 American dystopian film directed by Francis Lawrence from a screenplay by Simon Beaufoy and Michael deBruyn, based on the 2009 novel Catching Fire by Suzanne Collins. The sequel to The Hunger Games (2012), it is the second installment of The Hunger Games film series. The film stars Jennifer Lawrence, Josh Hutcherson, Liam Hemsworth, Woody Harrelson, Elizabeth Banks, Lenny Kravitz, Philip Seymour Hoffman, Jeffrey Wright, Stanley Tucci, and Donald Sutherland. In the film, Katniss Everdeen (Lawrence) and Peeta Mellark (Hutcherson) become targets of the Capitol after their victory in the Games inspires uprisings in Panem.

Lionsgate announced a sequel based on Collins' second Hunger Games novel in 2012, with Gary Ross initially set to return as director; Ross was replaced with Lawrence that May, while deBruyn completed several rewrites to Beaufoy's screenplay. The main cast was confirmed by September 2012 and principal photography began later that month, lasting until March 2013. Filming locations included Georgia, Hawaii, and New Jersey.

The Hunger Games: Catching Fire premiered at the Odeon Leicester Square in London on November 11, 2013, and was released in the United States on November 22, by Lionsgate. The film received critical acclaim, with praise for Lawrence's performance, action sequences, musical score, screenplay, visual effects, emotional depth, and themes. Many critics considered the film to be the best film in the series. The film grossed $869 million, making it the fifth-highest-grossing film of 2013, the highest-grossing film featuring a female lead since The Exorcist (1973), the highest-grossing Lionsgate film (until it was surpassed by Michael in 2026), and the highest-grossing film of the series. It also set the box office records for the biggest November opening weekend and the biggest Thanksgiving period box-office total at the time.

Among its accolades, the film was nominated for the Broadcast Film Critics Association Award for Best Action Film and a Saturn Award for Best Science Fiction Film. For her performance, Lawrence was nominated for the Empire Award, Broadcast Film Critics Association Award, and Saturn Award for Best Actress. The soundtrack's lead single, "Atlas" by Coldplay, was nominated for the Grammy Award for Best Song Written for Visual Media and for the Golden Globe Award for Best Original Song. The film was followed by the sequels The Hunger Games: Mockingjay – Part 1 (2014) and Part 2 (2015), which conclude the original series.

== Plot ==
Katniss Everdeen and Peeta Mellark have settled into a life of material comfort but emotional unease back in District 12 following their joint victory in the 74th Hunger Games. (Note: as depicted in The Hunger Games (film) (2012)) Katniss was traumatized by the Games and remains emotionally distant from Peeta. President Coriolanus Snow visits Katniss and reveals that her defiance in the Games has inspired revolts across Panem. To suppress the rebellion, he demands that she and Peeta feign love during the Victory Tour in order to convince the districts that their planned double suicide was an act of love, not of defiance against the Capitol. Snow threatens to destroy District 12 and kill their families and friends if they refuse.

Katniss agrees, but her and Peeta's Victory Tour speeches inadvertently only lead to further unrest across the districts. In District 11, they go off-script as they show empathy for Rue and Thresh, and watch a man be executed for giving them a defiant Mockingjay salute. To avoid further agitating the Capital, the two publicly announce their engagement to persuade Panem's citizens of their love, but President Snow remains unconvinced. Upon returning home, Katniss witnesses the brutality of the Capitol's Peacekeepers. Katniss' best friend, Gale Hawthorne, is publicly whipped for trying to intervene in the beating and pillaging of civilians, leading to a violent confrontation that results in Katniss, Peeta and Haymitch's involvement.

The 75th Hunger Games, the third Quarter Quell, is announced with a twist: tributes will be reaped from the existing pool of victors. As the only living female victor from District 12, Katniss must compete. At the Reaping, Haymitch's name is drawn, but Peeta volunteers for him. Ordered by Snow, Katniss wears a wedding dress for her pre-game interview, which her stylist Cinna designs to shift into a Mockingjay symbol, which has become a symbol of defiance against the Capitol. To disrupt the Games, Peeta lies during his pre-Games interview, claiming he and Katniss are married and expecting a child, causing an uproar among the Capitol's citizens and demands to cancel the Games. Just before Katniss enters the arena, Cinna is brutally beaten, dragged away, and killed, in front of her.

In the Games, Katniss and Peeta ally with Finnick Odair and Mags from District 4. They face deadly poisonous fog at night; when Peeta is injured, the elderly Mags sacrifices herself so that Finnick can help save Peeta rather than her. They also battle mutated mandrills, during which the female victor from District 6 sacrifices herself to save Peeta's life.

Fleeing to a central beach, the group unites with Beetee and Wiress from District 3, and Johanna Mason from District 7. Wiress discovers the arena is designed like a clock, with dangers recurring each hour. The Careers suddenly ambush the group, and the central beach suddenly spins, rendering Wiress' deduction useless. Katniss and Johanna kill District 1's Gloss and Cashmere, but Wiress is killed.

Beetee plans to lure the remaining Careers to the beach and electrocute them with lightning. The group prepares the trap by laying a wire from a tree—which is hit with lightning every 12 hours—to the shore. When District 2 victors Brutus and Enobaria arrive, Johanna incapacitates Katniss, removes the tracker from her arm, and flees. Katniss discovers an unconscious Beetee, seemingly electrocuted by the arena's force field. Hearing a cannon (signaling Brutus's death) and unable to find Peeta, Katniss nearly attacks Finnick, suspecting betrayal. He reminds her of the real enemy. Katniss attaches the wire to an arrow which she shoots into the arena's roof just as lightning strikes; the electricity destroys the arena's force field, blows a hole in the roof, and shuts down the arena's systems, but also knocks Katniss unconscious. She is picked up by a hovercraft.

Katniss wakes in the hovercraft with Haymitch, Finnick, an unconscious Beetee, and Head Gamemaker Plutarch Heavensbee. Haymitch reveals they are headed to District 13, which not only still exists but is the headquarters of a full-scale rebellion that erupted during the Games. He explains that Heavensbee and several of the tributes were part of a rebel plan to rescue her, but the Capitol captured Peeta and Johanna. Enraged by Haymitch's failure to save Peeta, Katniss attacks him before she is sedated. She later wakes in District 13 with Gale, who assures her that her family is safe, but tells her the Capitol has destroyed District 12.

== Cast ==
- Jennifer Lawrence as Katniss Everdeen
- Josh Hutcherson as Peeta Mellark
- Liam Hemsworth as Gale Hawthorne
- Woody Harrelson as Haymitch Abernathy
- Elizabeth Banks as Effie Trinket
- Lenny Kravitz as Cinna
- Philip Seymour Hoffman as Plutarch Heavensbee
- Jeffrey Wright as Beetee Latier
- Stanley Tucci as Caesar Flickerman
- Donald Sutherland as President Coriolanus Snow
- Toby Jones as Claudius Templesmith
- Willow Shields as Primrose Everdeen
- Sam Claflin as Finnick Odair
- Lynn Cohen as Mags Flanagan
- Jena Malone as Johanna Mason
- Amanda Plummer as Wiress
- Meta Golding as Enobaria
- Bruno Gunn as Brutus
- Alan Ritchson as Gloss
- Stephanie Leigh Schlund as Cashmere
- Patrick St. Esprit as Romulus Thread
- Paula Malcomson as Mrs. Everdeen
- Stef Dawson as Annie Cresta
- Nelson Ascencio as Flavius
- Bruce Bundy as Octavia
- E. Roger Mitchell as Chaff

== Production ==
=== Pre-production ===
Lionsgate announced that a film adaptation of Catching Fire would be released as The Hunger Games: Catching Fire on November 22, 2013, as a sequel to the film adaptation of The Hunger Games, with principal photography to take place in September 2012. Simon Beaufoy was hired to write the script for the film and wrote two drafts before leaving after Gary Ross, director of The Hunger Games decided not to direct the sequel. The shooting timeframe was co-ordinated between Lionsgate and 20th Century Fox, in order to allow time for Jennifer Lawrence to shoot X-Men: Days of Future Past, the sequel to Fox's X-Men: First Class, in January 2013.

On April 10, 2012, it was announced that Gary Ross, director of The Hunger Games, would not return due to a 'tight' and 'fitted' schedule. Ross cited the lack of time he had for directing and writing the film in the three and a half months after the release of the first film as the reason for leaving the franchise, hence his decision to move on to direct Free State of Jones. Bennett Miller, Joe Cornish, Francis Lawrence and Juan Antonio Bayona were all being considered to direct the new film. On April 19, 2012, it was announced that Francis Lawrence was offered the director position for the film. Lionsgate officially announced Francis Lawrence as the director for Catching Fire on May 3, 2012. Two days later, it was reported that Michael Arndt (Toy Story 3, Little Miss Sunshine) was in talks to re-write the script for Catching Fire. On May 24, 2012, the film was renamed The Hunger Games: Catching Fire and Arndt was confirmed as the new writer of the script. Arndt was paid $400,000 a week for re-writing the script. Producer Nina Jacobson hired Scott Frank to rewrite the script when the film was weeks away from production. Jacobsen described the process of Frank's rewrite as "laying down new train track while conducting the moving train at the same time."

According to sources, the adaptation needed to be done filming by December 2012 to fit Jennifer Lawrence's schedule. When X-Men: Days of Future Past lost its original director and shooting for the film was delayed until April 2013, Jennifer Lawrence was no longer needed to be filming in January 2013 and the shooting timeframe for The Hunger Games: Catching Fire was extended to March (including several breaks due to the holidays and awards season). The film featured sequences filmed in the IMAX format.

=== Casting ===
In July 2012, it was announced that Jena Malone would portray Johanna Mason, that Amanda Plummer would portray Wiress, and that Philip Seymour Hoffman would portray Plutarch Heavensbee. Following this, in August 2012, it was announced that Lynn Cohen had been cast as Mags. Before Cohen was cast as Mags, Melissa Leo was considered for the role; she would later say that she was disappointed that she didn't get the role. Alan Ritchson was cast as Gloss on August 9, Sam Claflin as Finnick Odair on August 22, and Jeffrey Wright as Beetee on September 7. Tony Shalhoub was reported to be the frontrunner for the role of Beetee. Grant Gustin auditioned for the role of Finnick Odair. Garrett Hedlund was offered the role, but he passed on it as he was working on On the Road. Taylor Kitsch and Armie Hammer were reported to be the frontrunner for the role of Finnick, with Kitsch later stating that it wasn't going to happen.

=== Filming ===
Production officially began on September 10, 2012, with shooting concluding for some of the cast on December 21, 2012. After the Christmas break, filming resumed for two weeks in mid January for some of the main cast and was placed on hold for awards season. Principal photography resumed and concluded in March 2013. Shooting first took place in and around metropolitan Atlanta, Georgia and then moved to Hawaii, to shoot the arena scenes. The cast and crew were on a busy schedule, working 14-hour days and six days a week. In an interview with MTV, Josh Hutcherson confirmed scenes in the film would use IMAX cameras by stating, "They're shooting, I think, all the stuff in the arena is going to be IMAX". Jennifer Lawrence and Liam Hemsworth were in Ringwood, New Jersey shooting District 12 scenes involving snow for the beginning of the film on January 31 and February 1. Jennifer Lawrence confirmed that she would fly out to Hawaii on February 25, the day after she won the Academy Award for Best Actress at the 85th Academy Awards due to her performance in Silver Linings Playbook to shoot for the final 9 days along with Claflin and Hutcherson.

In late March, filming occurred in the Universal Studios backlot and was kept extremely secretive. Witnesses reported towers and fences on set. None of the main cast were believed to have been on set. Reshoots were scheduled for April 13 in Atlanta. With the base camp set up at Executive Park off North Druid Hills Road, filming also occurred at the Goat Farm Arts Center.

Francis Lawrence has estimated an hour of the film would be devoted to Arena scenes, and said that cameras would be mounted to avoid the shaky-cam look from the first film. In an IMAX featurette, Francis Lawrence also confirmed that scenes taking place in the Arena were shot on IMAX cameras to distinguish them from scenes external to the Arena. Ritchson originally shot Gloss' death scene as him getting one of Katniss' arrows to the face upon slitting Wiress' throat, but the filmmakers later decided during post-production that it was "too gruesome", so they edited Katniss' arrow to strike Gloss' chest instead despite Gloss' head moving as initially intended. Approximately 50 minutes of the film's footage was shot in the IMAX format, through the use of three IMAX 15 perf/65mm film cameras.

=== Costumes ===
Sarah Burton, creative director at Alexander McQueen, gave pieces of McQueen's collection to costume designer Trish Summerville. Summerville collaborated with Indonesian designer Tex Saverio when designing Katniss' wedding dress for the Quarter Quell interviews.

== Music ==
=== Soundtrack ===
British singer Ed Sheeran recorded three songs for the soundtrack, but Lionsgate declined the offer. On May 14, 2013, Alexandra Patsavas was listed in the credits as music supervisor, replacing T Bone Burnett from the first film. Coldplay were announced as the first official artist to be featured on the Catching Fire soundtrack album, with the song "Atlas", released worldwide on September 6, 2013. Christina Aguilera announced that her song, "We Remain", would be part of the official soundtrack of the film. Other artists featured on the soundtrack include Of Monsters and Men with "Silhouettes", Sia featuring The Weeknd & Diplo with "Elastic Heart", The National with "Lean", The Weeknd with "Devil May Cry", Imagine Dragons with "Who We Are", Lorde with "Everybody Wants to Rule the World", The Lumineers with "Gale Song", Ellie Goulding with "Mirror", Patti Smith with "Capitol Letter", Santigold with "Shooting Arrows at the Sky", Mikky Ekko with "Place for Us", Phantogram with "Lights", and Antony and the Johnsons with "Angel on Fire".

=== Score ===
In October 2012, composer James Newton Howard confirmed that he would return to score the film. The score album was released on November 25, 2013. All songs written and composed by James Newton Howard, except "We're a Team" (co-written by Coldplay band members: Guy Berryman, Jonny Buckland, Will Champion, and Chris Martin).

== Release ==
=== Marketing ===
On November 16, 2012, the first teaser trailer was released with The Twilight Saga: Breaking Dawn – Part 2 and revealed the official logo and tagline for the film. Lionsgate announced a sweepstakes competition where 12 fans would have their name listed in the film's credits. On January 11, 2013, Entertainment Weekly released a 2013 Preview edition of their magazine, with the first look of Lawrence as Katniss and Claflin as Finnick on the cover as well as several stills showcasing scenes from the film. On February 22, both Hitfix and the official Facebook page debuted two viral posters of the Victory Tour featuring Jennifer Lawrence (Katniss) and Josh Hutcherson (Peeta).

On January 28, 2013, CapitolCouture.PN, a promotional site for the film's fashion and culture, opened and could only be unlocked with a passcode. Once in, a picture of a blue chair appeared and told readers to check back on March 4. On March 4, 2013, the site began to release portraits of the various characters.

Alongside the announcement of the teaser trailer premiering at the 2013 MTV Movie Awards, Lionsgate revealed a new website called TheHungerGamesExplorer. On April 10, the website was updated and fans had to tweet using the hashtag #HungerGamesExplorer to unlock new stills from the movie. A still could be unlocked every day leading up to April 14, 2013, the teaser trailer's release date.

The teaser trailer thus debuted at the 2013 MTV Movie Awards on April 14, presented by Liam Hemsworth, and the trailer was posted on TheHungerGamesExplorer and YouTube after the ceremony. "Beyond Fire" by T.T.L. was played as the trailer music.

An exclusive new trailer debuted at San Diego Comic-Con on July 20, 2013, also being released online on that day. Walmart released the first TV spot on their Facebook page on October 14, featuring Coldplay's song, "Atlas".

On October 27, 2013, during the fifth inning of Game 4 of the 2013 World Series, the final trailer was released. Three days later, on October 30, 2013, a new IMAX poster for the film debuted.

=== Theatrical ===
The film premiered at the Odeon Leicester Square theater in London on November 11, 2013. The film was later released on November 22, 2013, in the United States in conventional and IMAX theaters. The film was also shown in the 4DX format in selected international territories. It features motion-enhanced seating, wind, water sprays, strobe lightning, and scent-based special effects. The film was released in 4,165 theaters in the United States and Canada alone.

=== Home media ===
The Blu-ray/DVD release date for the film in the United States was March 7, 2014. The entire Hunger Games series was released on 4K UHD Blu-ray on November 8, 2016.

Actresses Lynn Cohen and Stephanie Leigh Schlund, who played Mags and Cashmere in the film, respectively, promoted the DVD and Blu-ray versions of the film with an appearance at the March 7, 2014 midnight release of the product at the Walmart in Secaucus, New Jersey. As of March 16, 2014, Catching Fire has sold 2,073,719 DVDs along with 2,186,430 Blu-ray discs for $35.4 million and $43.8 million, respectively, totaling $79.4 million of revenue within two weeks of release.

== Reception ==
=== Box office ===
The Hunger Games: Catching Fire earned $425.3 million in North America and $444.6 million in other countries for a worldwide total of $869.9 million. Worldwide, it is the highest-grossing film of The Hunger Games series, the second highest-grossing film distributed by Lionsgate and the fifth-highest-grossing 2013 film.

In North America, Catching Fire is the 42nd-highest-grossing film, the highest-grossing film of The Hunger Games series, the highest-grossing film distributed by Lionsgate and the highest-grossing 2013 film. Box Office Mojo estimates that the film sold more than 50 million tickets in the United States and Canada. It became the first 2-D film since The Dark Knight (2008), as well as the first film with a female lead since The Exorcist (1973), to top the yearly box office. It is also the top-selling film in Fandango history, surpassing previous record-holder Avatar. The film earned $25.3 million during Thursday late-night showings. It topped the box office on its opening day with $71.0 million (including Thursday late-night showings), which is higher than its predecessor's opening-day gross ($67.3 million) and is also the seventh largest single-day and opening-day gross. During its opening weekend, The Hunger Games: Catching Fire claimed first place with $158.1 million, opening higher than its predecessor ($152.5 million). This was the sixth-highest-grossing opening weekend, the second-highest-grossing opening weekend of 2013 behind Iron Man 3 ($174.1 million), and the highest-grossing opening weekend in November, breaking the record set by The Twilight Saga: New Moon ($142.9 million) in 2009. The film held the November weekend record for nine years until it was topped in 2022 by Black Panther: Wakanda Forever ($181.3 million). It was in first place for two consecutive weekends. The film also broke the following records: the biggest Friday for a film in its second weekend, the largest three-day ($74.2 million) and largest five-day ($109.9 million) Thanksgiving gross. The latter two records would be held until 2019 when they were both surpassed by Frozen II. The film achieved the fifth-highest-grossing opening week (Friday-to-Thursday), the third-highest non-opening Wednesday and the fourth-largest second weekend.

Outside North America, it is the highest-grossing film of The Hunger Games series, the highest-grossing film released by Lionsgate and the seventh-highest-grossing 2013 film. On its first weekend, it was only released in Brazil (November 15, 2013), where it grossed $2.4 million on its opening day and $5.26 million for the weekend. On the following Wednesday and Thursday, it opened in 42 more territories, bringing its total to $32 million in a week. The film opened in 63 other territories and earned $138.4 million during the weekend ($146.6 million including its first week in Brazil). Its three largest openings occurred in the UK, Ireland and Malta ($19.8 million), China ($13.0 million) and Germany ($12.9 million). In total earnings, its largest countries are the UK, Ireland and Malta ($55.5 million), Germany ($43.4 million) and Australia ($34.3 million).

=== Critical response ===
On review aggregator Rotten Tomatoes the film holds an approval rating of 90% based on 291 reviews, with a rating average of 7.6/10. The website's critical consensus reads: "Smart, smoothly directed, and enriched with a deeper exploration of the franchise's thought-provoking themes, Catching Fire proves a thoroughly compelling second installment in the Hunger Games series." It was the highest rated science fiction/fantasy movie of the year on the website. Metacritic assigned the film a weighted average score of 76 out of 100 based on 49 critics, indicating "generally favorable reviews". According to polls conducted during the opening weekend by CinemaScore, audiences gave the film an average rating of "A" on an A+ to F scale.

The Hollywood Reporter said that the film has received "generally positive reviews" and CNN reported that reviews were "overwhelmingly positive" but noted that "an overarching complaint" was that it "runs needlessly long ... and the screenplay and direction do occasionally fall short." Entertainment Weekly said the consensus was that the sequel is "a more-confident, more-polished movie that delves deeper into Panem's political conflict". It also reported, "Critics are impressed that [Lawrence] commits to Katniss just as much as she would a complex David O. Russell character."

Writing for The Village Voice, Stephanie Zacharek praised Jennifer Lawrence's performance, writing that the actress is "both on fire and in the process of becoming, and it’s magnificent to watch." Peter Travers of Rolling Stone gave the film 3.5 stars out of four and said, "Pop-culture escapism can be thrilling when dished out by experts. Katniss is a character worth a handful of sequels. And Lawrence lights up the screen. You'll follow her anywhere." He also commended supporting actors Sam Claflin and Jena Malone. Reviewing on Roger Ebert's website, Susan Wloszczyna of USA Today awarded the film three out of four stars, praising the acting of Jeffrey Wright, Amanda Plummer and Jena Malone and referring to the challenges of the arena as "visually intriguing." Wloszczyna writes: "...the one truly fresh invention—and the one that matters most—is Katniss herself. With each on-screen chapter, the poor girl from District 12 continues to fulfill her destiny as an inspiration and a rebel fighter." Ian Nathan of Empire gave the film 4 stars out of 5 and noted that it was even better than the first film. He praised director Lawrence for "taking a more muscular approach" and "sensibly downplaying" the love triangle, noting that "neither [Peeta nor Gale], quite frankly, are fit to lay a pinky on [Katniss'] quiver". One fault he did find was in Philip Seymour Hoffman's "surprisingly ineffective performance".

A negative review came from Sophie Monks Kaufman of Little White Lies, who praised Lawrence's performance but criticized the "dilution of the ingredients that made The Hunger Games so gripping." She also found fault with the "lumbering" plot, the "hamminess" of President Snow and Plutarch Heavensbee and the "lackluster and unconvincing script culled from a dramatically difficult book". David Denby of The New Yorker argued that the premise "doesn't make a lot of sense". He praised the "impressive" first act and Jennifer Lawrence, for "project[ing] the kind of strength that Katharine Hepburn had when she was young." Denby found the second act "attenuated and rhythmless" and criticised the "incoherent" finale that "will send the audience scurrying back to the book to find out what’s supposed to be going on".

In July 2025, it was one of the films voted for the "Readers' Choice" edition of The New York Times' list of "The 100 Best Movies of the 21st Century," finishing at number 256.

=== Accolades ===
List of awards and nominations
Year	Award	Category	Recipients	Result
2013
2013	Golden Trailer Awards	Best Action Poster		Nominated
2013	Golden Trailer Awards	Best Independent Poster	Victory Tour Close Up	Nominated
2013	Hollywood Film Awards	Best Song	"Atlas"	Won
2013	San Diego Film Critics Society	Best Supporting Actress	Elizabeth Banks	Nominated
2013	San Diego Film Critics Society	Best Editing	Alan Edward Bell	Nominated
2014	Grammy Awards	Best Song Written for Visual Media	"Atlas"	Nominated
2014	Golden Globe Awards	Best Original Song	"Atlas"	Nominated
2014	Critics' Choice Movie Awards	Best Action Film		Nominated
2014	Critics' Choice Movie Awards	Best Actress in an Action Movie	Jennifer Lawrence	Nominated
2014	Critics' Choice Movie Awards	Best Song	"Atlas"	Nominated
2014	IGN's Best of 2013 Movie Awards	Best Movie		Nominated
2014	IGN's Best of 2013 Movie Awards	Best Sci-Fi Movie		Nominated
2014	IGN's Best of 2013 Movie Awards	Best Movie Poster	IMAX poster	Nominated
2014	People's Choice Awards	Favorite Year End Movie		Won
2014	Kids' Choice Awards	Favorite Movie		Won
2014	Kids' Choice Awards	Favorite Movie Actress	Jennifer Lawrence	Won
2014	Kids' Choice Awards	Favorite Female Buttkicker	Jennifer Lawrence	Won
2014	Kids' Choice Awards	Favorite Female Buttkicker	Jena Malone	Nominated
2014	Empire Awards	Best Film		Nominated
2014	Empire Awards	Best Thriller		Won
2014	Empire Awards	Best Sci-Fi/Fantasy		Nominated
2014	Empire Awards	Best Actress	Jennifer Lawrence	Nominated
2014	Empire Awards	Best Supporting Actor	Sam Claflin	Nominated
2014	MTV Movie Awards	Movie of the Year		Won
2014	MTV Movie Awards	Best Male Performance	Josh Hutcherson	Won
2014	MTV Movie Awards	Best Female Performance	Jennifer Lawrence	Won
2014	MTV Movie Awards	Best Shirtless Performance	Sam Claflin	Nominated
2014	MTV Movie Awards	Best Fight	Jennifer Lawrence, Josh Hutcherson, & Sam Claflin vs. Mutant Monkeys	Nominated
2014	MTV Movie Awards	Best Villain	Donald Sutherland	Nominated
2014	MTV Movie Awards	Best On-Screen Transformation	Elizabeth Banks	Nominated
2014	MTV Movie Awards	Favorite Character	Katniss Everdeen	Nominated
2014	Golden Trailer Awards	Best Action Trailer	"World Event"	Won
2014	Golden Trailer Awards	Best Fantasy Adventure Trailer	"Official Theatrical Trailer"	Nominated
2014	Golden Trailer Awards	Best Original Score	"Final Trailer"	Won
2014	Golden Trailer Awards	Best Action TV spot	"Let it Fly"	Nominated
2014	Golden Trailer Awards	Best Fantasy/Adventure TV spot	"Atlas"	Nominated
2014	Golden Trailer Awards	Best Romance TV spot	"We Remain"	Nominated
2014	Golden Trailer Awards	Best Action Poster		Won
2014	Golden Trailer Awards	Best Drama Poster	"Teaser Poster"	Nominated
2014	Golden Trailer Awards	Best Wildposts	"Outdoor Teaser"	Won
2014	Golden Trailer Awards	Best Standee for a Feature Film		Nominated
2014	Saturn Awards	Best Science Fiction Film		Nominated
2014	Saturn Awards	Best Director	Francis Lawrence	Nominated
2014	Saturn Awards	Best Actress	Jennifer Lawrence	Nominated
2014	Saturn Awards	Best Supporting Actress	Jena Malone	Nominated
2014	Saturn Awards	Best Production Design	Philip Messina	Nominated
2014	Saturn Awards	Best Editing	Alan Edward Bell	Nominated
2014	Saturn Awards	Best Costume	Trish Summerville	Won
2014	Teen Choice Awards	Choice Movie: Sci-Fi/Fantasy		Won
2014	Teen Choice Awards	Choice Movie Actress: Sci-Fi/Fantasy	Jennifer Lawrence	Won
2014	Teen Choice Awards	Choice Movie Actor: Sci-Fi/Fantasy	Liam Hemsworth	Nominated
2014	Teen Choice Awards	Choice Movie Actor: Sci-Fi/Fantasy	Josh Hutcherson	Won
2014	Teen Choice Awards	Choice Movie: Villain	Donald Sutherland	Won
2014	Teen Choice Awards	Choice Movie: Scene Stealer	Sam Claflin	Nominated
2014	Teen Choice Awards	Choice Movie: Liplock	Jennifer Lawrence and Josh Hutcherson	Nominated

== Sequels ==
In July 2012, Lionsgate announced that two films based on the final book in The Hunger Games trilogy, Mockingjay, were scheduled to be released. The first film, The Hunger Games: Mockingjay – Part 1, was released on November 21, 2014, while the second film, The Hunger Games: Mockingjay – Part 2, was released on November 20, 2015. Principal photography on the two-part film began on September 23, 2013, in Atlanta and concluded on June 20, 2014, in Berlin, Germany.
