= I'm God =

2020 track by Clams Casino and Imogen Heap

- Single cover art on streaming services, taken from Perdues dans New York (1989)

Instrumental by Clams Casino and Imogen Heap
- B-side: "I'm the Devil" (vinyl)
- Released: 2011 (unofficial); April 24, 2020 (official)
- Recorded: c. April 2009
- Genre: Cloud rap; witch house
- Length: 4:37
- Label: Clams Casino Productions
- Songwriters: Michael Volpe, Imogen Heap
- Producer: Clams Casino

Clams Casino chronology
"I'm the Devil" (2020)	"I'm God" (2020)	"Haunt" (2021)

Imogen Heap chronology
"The Quiet" (2019)	"I'm God" (2020)	"Phase and Flow" (2020)

Official audio
- "I'm God" on YouTube

"I'm God" is an instrumental by the American producer Michael Volpe, known professionally as Clams Casino, and the British singer Imogen Heap. Volpe created "I'm God" in 2009 by sampling Heap's song "Just for Now" (2005), after learning of her through a friend. Volpe sent the track to American rapper Lil B; the instrumental is featured on a song of the same name on Lil B's second mixtape, 6 Kiss (2009), containing his vocals. Volpe self-released "I'm God" in 2011 and, in 2012, it appeared on his Instrumentals 2 mixtape. Following years of unsuccessful attempts to clear the sample usage, it was officially released on streaming on April 24, 2020, appearing on Volpe's Instrumental Relics compilation.

A cloud rap song, "I'm God" is noted for its ethereal and dream-like aspects. It received a cult following on the Internet, being unofficially reuploaded by fans to social media, including in the form of a music video that incorporates clips from the French film Perdues dans New York (1989). "I'm God" went on to be influential to the cloud rap genre. An official mashup with ASAP Rocky's song "Demons", titled "I Smoked Away My Brain", was released in 2023; it entered numerous charts and received multiple certifications.

== Background and release ==
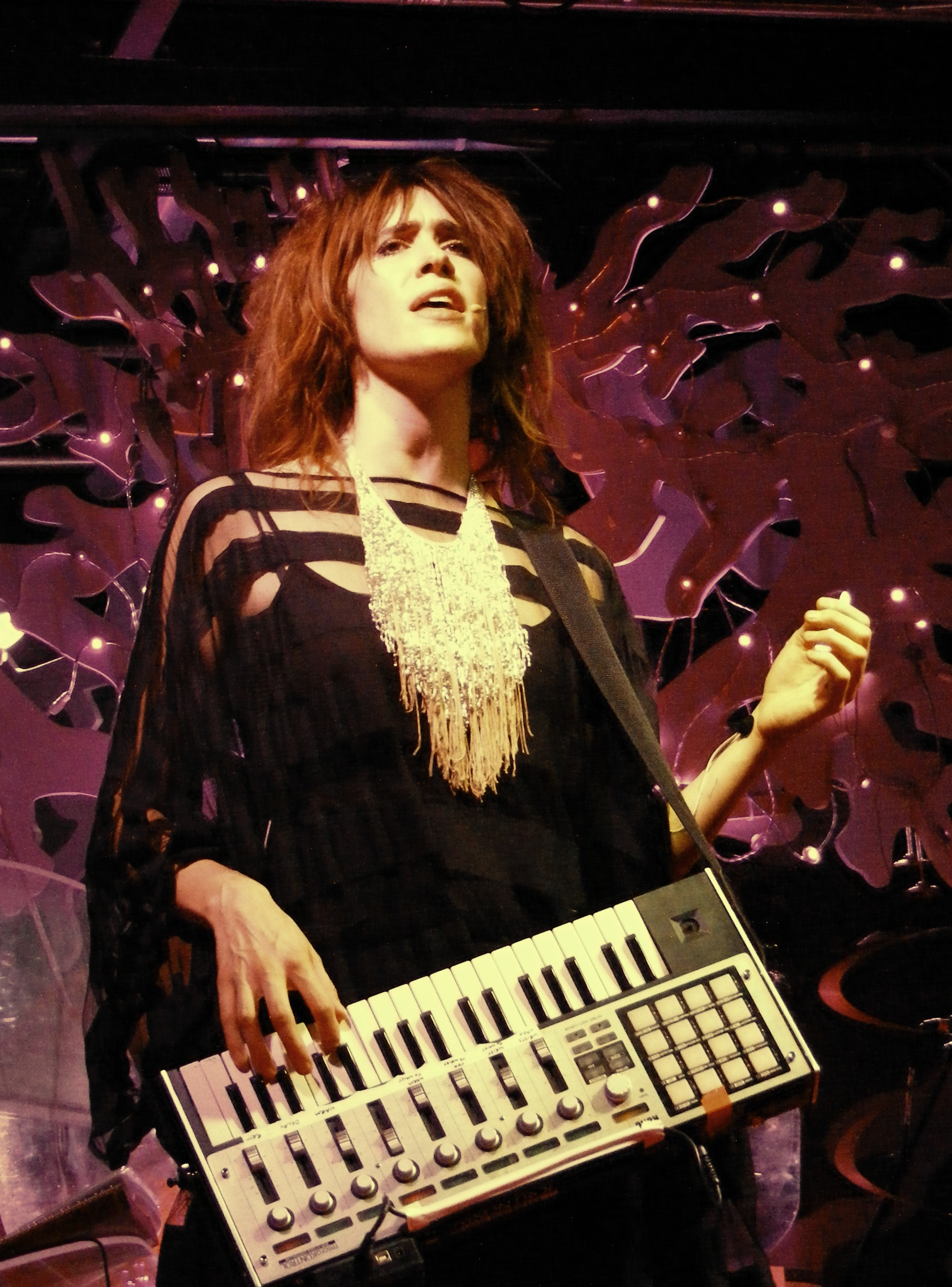
Clams Casino sampled "Just for Now", a song by Imogen Heap (pictured in 2010).

Michael Volpe, known professionally as Clams Casino, is an American music producer. He started publishing music seriously in late 2007; at the time, Volpe was using the social network MySpace to contact artists and rappers, sending free instrumentals to them. As he was a big fan of the Pack, he decided to contact one of its rappers, Lil B. They first met in September 2008 via MySpace, and Volpe later obtained Lil B's e-mail address.

"I'm God" was produced around April 2009. The track samples "Just for Now" (2005), a song by British singer Imogen Heap. Volpe was introduced to Heap's music by a friend, who also suggested a song for Volpe to sample. He went through other tracks of Heap's and discovered "Just for Now". Volpe liked Heap's voice on the track and created different beats with it, including "I'm God". Another beat he created was "I'm the Devil", which samples "Just for Now" but in reverse.

Volpe was indifferent to "I'm God" at first and did not see it as unusual or important. He sent the instrumental to different artists, including Lil B, who, according to Volpe, "freaked out". Lil B then recorded vocals over it, and the final result appeared on his second mixtape, 6 Kiss, which was released on December 22, 2009. Lil B later showed the "I'm God" instrumental to Soulja Boy, who also rapped over it in his song "2 Milli" (2010).

In 2011, the "I'm God" instrumental was unofficially released by Volpe on Zippyshare and Twitter; the next year, it appeared on his Instrumentals 2 mixtape. Originally, Volpe did not consider the need to get official permission to use the "Just for Now" sample; he was not focused on earning money from his work, but simply on sharing free tracks on social media for enjoyment. In the following years, Volpe tried to have the sample cleared for an official release, but encountered issues as "Just for Now" had been released through a major label. Although Volpe's and Heap's teams were having trouble with the sample clearance, Volpe said that Heap was interested as long as she was credited, and she enjoyed "I'm God". In 2019, Heap's team indicated they were open to an official release. On April 24, 2020, the song was officially released on streaming as part of Volpe's Instrumental Relics mixtape following his acquisition of the rights to sample "Just for Now", with Heap receiving credit alongside him. The song was released on streaming through Clams Casino Productions, and a 7-inch vinyl with "I'm the Devil" as the B-side was released through Second City Prints.

== Composition ==
"I'm God"
Multiple critics and journalists highlighted the song's ethereal and dream-like aspects. (Note: Attributed to multiple references: Complex, Fact, Pitchfork, The Guardian, MusicRadar, The New York Times, and AllMusic.)

"I'm God" is an instrumental song in the cloud rap genre. Volpe's production was described as dream-like and delicate by The Guardian's writers, while a MusicRadar writer said that it was "sultry" and relaxed. Rolling Stone's Mosi Reeves called it "amniotic". In the context of Lil B's version, Randall Roberts of Los Angeles Times felt that Volpe made "I'm God" "sound as freaky as the rapper is chaotic". Pitchfork writer Nadine Smith said that the song "decays and disintegrates inside your eardrum", being innovative and ethereal. Vice's Dhruva Balram described the instrumental as "psychedelic", while Smith thought that the drum programming resembled boom bap more than trap. Paul Simpson of AllMusic described the drums as "sludgy".

"I'm God" extensively samples a stretched-out version of Imogen Heap's "Just for Now". Her vocals were edited to be of a "floating, angelic quality", according to Steve Shaw of Fact, while Complex's Craig Jenkins characterized the vocals as spectral, accompanied by soft bass and muted drums. Jon Caramanica of The New York Times wrote that the song makes Heap sound more desolate than in her solo work. Simpson said that the vocals brought a deep, cavernous feel, and noted that they were rearranged with a meticulousness akin to Philip Glass. Smith described the sample as "unforgettable", while Reeves called it creative.

== Reception and legacy ==
Multiple writers have described the "I'm God" instrumental as highly influential to the cloud rap genre. (Note: Attributed to multiple references: Red Bull, Vice, Complex, and Rolling Stone.) Katie Cunningham of Red Bull described it as the genre's "seminal track", while Vice's Balram said that the track was generally regarded as cloud rap's birth. Schube of Complex described it as "a brilliant and stunning landmark" of the genre, while Kyle Garb, writing for the same magazine, considered it a key track from the witch house era. Spin named "I'm God" the seventh best track of 2011. In 2012, NME wrote that it was "conceivably the most gorgeous backing track of the decade". In 2013, Complex's Craig Jenkins called it one of the "25 best rap beats of the last 5 years" and said that it stands out as the opening track of Volpe's discography, which was by then full of "majestic, oceanic production work". Reviewing Instrumental Relics (2020), Smith of Pitchfork described "I'm God" as "the definitive Clams Casino recording". In 2025, Resident Advisor named it the 35th best electronic track between 2000 and 2025. Like the instrumental, Lil B's version is also considered an important and influential cloud rap song, with Rolling Stone ranking it as the 37th best West Coast hip-hop song of all time.

"I'm God" was one of the first known productions by Volpe, and received a cult following on the Internet. By 2011, the song had inspired people to create tracks sampling "Just for Now" and to recreate the "I'm God" instrumental when it still was not available. Smith said that when the instrumental was released unofficially that year, it was "instantly iconic, immediately imitated, and impossible to recreate". "I'm God" was shared on file-sharing services and unofficially uploaded to YouTube, SoundCloud and other social media by fans, becoming viral. Cunningham called it one of the most expansive hits from hip-hop's blogosphere era, which captured the interest of every Internet user with a craving for new sounds when it was unofficially released in 2011. Schube of Complex said that the track had been "pseudo-viral for a number of years" by 2016.

An unofficial music video for "I'm God", which uses clips from the French film Perdues dans New York (1989), became synonymous with the track. Uploaded to YouTube before the song's official release, it had 25 million views by May 2020. Its comment section contains users mourning the death of people close to them. Balram of Vice said that "I'm God" has been associated with "stories of hope and recovery", with Internet users describing the song's impact while they had depression; Cunningham said that the song "resonated really deeply" with multiple people. According to Balram, the song received a cult following in part because of its association with two suicide stories: Billy Watts, who had posted the song to his Instagram account weeks before his death, and David Higgs, who referred to the song in an apparent suicide note posted to 4chan—although it is unconfirmed that he died. The unofficial music video's title was updated as a tribute to Watts and Higgs.

== Track listing ==
Single – Streaming

- "I'm God" – 4:37

"I'm God" / "I'm the Devil" 7" vinyl

- "I'm God" – 4:37
- "I'm the Devil" – 3:41

== Personnel ==
Adapted from the 7" vinyl liner notes.

- Michael Volpe — production, mixing
- Imogen Heap — voice sample

== Certifications ==
Certifications for "I'm God"
Region	Certification	Certified units/sales
New Zealand (RMNZ)	Platinum	30,000^{‡}
United Kingdom (BPI)	Silver	200,000^{‡}
United States (RIAA)	Gold	500,000^{‡}
^{‡} Sales+streaming figures based on certification alone.

== I Smoked Away My Brain ==
"I Smoked Away My Brain (I'm God x Demons Mashup)"

Single by ASAP Rocky featuring Imogen Heap and Clams Casino
- Released: August 18, 2023
- Genre: Mashup; cloud rap
- Length: 3:12
- Label: ASAP Rocky Recordings
- Songwriters: Billy Steinberg; Imogen Heap; Michael Volpe; Rick Nowels; Marie-Claire D'Ubaldo; Rakim Mayers
- Producer: Clams Casino

Official audio
- "I Smoked Away My Brain (I'm God x Demons Mashup)" on YouTube

"I Smoked Away My Brain (I'm God x Demons Mashup)" is a mashup between "I'm God" and American rapper ASAP Rocky's "Demons", from his debut mixtape Live. Love. ASAP (2011). It was officially released on August 18, 2023. Before 2023, there were unofficial mashups between the two songs. It was included in disc two of Rocky's album Don't Be Dumb (2026).

Dani Blum of The New York Times included it in her list of "ethereal, emotional, chaotic and goofy cloud-rap gems", stating: "The result is mesmerizing: Rocky's pitched-down vocals echo over Heap's lilts. Everything collides in the chorus, with Heap's voice swooping around Rocky's".

=== Chart performance ===
Chart performance for "I Smoked Away My Brain (I'm God x Demons Mashup)"
Chart (2023–2026)	Peak position
Canada Hot 100 (Billboard)	74
Latvia Streaming (LaIPA)	6
Lithuania (AGATA)	4
New Zealand Hot Singles (RMNZ)	10
Norway (VG-lista)	71
Poland (Polish Streaming Top 100)	72
Sweden Heatseeker (Sverigetopplistan)	3
Switzerland (Schweizer Hitparade)	95
UK Singles (Official Charts)	80
US Bubbling Under Hot 100 (Billboard)	13
US Hot R&B/Hip-Hop Songs (Billboard)	35

=== Certifications ===
Certifications for "I Smoked Away My Brain (I'm God x Demons Mashup)"
Region	Certification	Certified units/sales
Austria (IFPI Austria)	Platinum	30,000^{‡}
Denmark (IFPI Danmark)	Gold	45,000^{‡}
France (SNEP)	Gold	100,000^{‡}
Germany (BVMI)	Gold	300,000^{‡}
Mexico (AMPROFON)	Platinum	140,000^{‡}
New Zealand (RMNZ)	2× Platinum	60,000^{‡}
Poland (ZPAV)	Platinum	50,000^{‡}
United Kingdom (BPI)	Gold	400,000^{‡}
United States (RIAA)	2× Platinum	2,000,000^{‡}
^{‡} Sales+streaming figures based on certification alone.
