= The Hunger Games: Catching Fire (soundtrack) =

2013 soundtrack album by various artists

The Hunger Games: Catching Fire (Original Motion Picture Soundtrack)

Soundtrack album by Various artists
- Released: November 15, 2013
- Recorded: 2012–13
- Genres: Indie rock; pop
- Length: 47:58
- Labels: Republic; Mercury
- Producer: Alexandra Patsavas

Singles from The Hunger Games: Catching Fire Original Motion Picture Soundtrack
- 1. "Atlas" Released: September 6, 2013; 2. "Elastic Heart" Released: October 1, 2013; 3. "We Remain" Released: October 1, 2013

Professional ratings
Aggregate scores
Source	Rating
Metacritic	63/100
Review scores
Source	Rating
Allmusic	3.5/5 stars
Consequence of Sound	3/5 stars
Digital Spy	4/5 stars
Entertainment Weekly	B+
Los Angeles Times	2/5 stars
New York Daily News	2/5 stars
Newsday	B+
Rolling Stone	2.5/5 stars
Slant Magazine	2.5/5 stars

The Hunger Games: Catching Fire (Original Motion Picture Soundtrack) is the soundtrack album to the 2013 film The Hunger Games: Catching Fire. The soundtrack was released through Republic Records on November 15, 2013.

The album sold 151,000 copies in the US in 2013, making it the seventh best-selling soundtrack album for the year.

== Promotion ==
On May 14, 2013, Alexandra Patsavas was listed in the credits as the new music supervisor, replacing T Bone Burnett from the first film. Christina Aguilera announced over Twitter on September 26, 2013, that her new song, "We Remain", would be part of the official soundtrack of the film. On September 26, as a part of the #ticktock campaign for The Hunger Games: Catching Fire, #ticktock9 revealed the artwork and track-listing to the soundtrack of the film.

=== Singles ===
"Atlas", written and performed by British alternative rock band Coldplay (who also co-wrote the song "We're a Team" for the Hunger Games Score), was released as the lead single from the soundtrack on September 6, 2013. The single charted high in many countries, including a debut at #12 on the UK Singles Chart, and peaking at #3 in the Netherlands and #9 in Italy. A lyric video for the song was also released alongside the single on the day of release. It features an art style reflecting the imagery of The Hunger Games. "Atlas" is one of only four songs on the album to actually be used in the film; the others are "Silhouettes", "Gale Song" and "Who We Are."

"Elastic Heart", performed by Australian recording artist Sia, was released as the second single from the soundtrack on October 1, 2013. It has charted on the Australian, UK and New Zealand music charts, the latter mentioned having greater success, peaking at number 7. The song later went on to be included on Sia's sixth studio album, 1000 Forms of Fear as a solo version, which charted at number 17 on the Billboard Hot 100 and number 10 on the UK Official Chart.

"We Remain", performed by American singer Christina Aguilera, was released as the third single from the soundtrack on October 1, 2013.

== Track listing ==
Standard edition
No.	Title	Writer(s)	Producer(s)	Length
1.	"Atlas" (Coldplay)	Guy Berryman; Jonny Buckland; Will Champion; Chris Martin	Coldplay; Daniel Green; Rik Simpson	3:56
2.	"Silhouettes" (Of Monsters and Men)	Ragnar Þórhallsson; Nanna Bryndís Hilmarsdóttir; Arnar Rósenkranz Hilmarsson; Kristján Páll Kristjánsson; Brynjar Leifsson	Of Monsters & Men; Jacquire King	4:31
3.	"Elastic Heart" (Sia featuring the Weeknd & Diplo)	Sia Furler; Thomas Wesley Pentz; Andrew Swanson; Abel Tesfaye	Diplo; Greg Kurstin	4:17
4.	"Lean" (The National)	Matt Berninger; Aaron Dessner	Dessner	4:31
5.	"We Remain" (Christina Aguilera)	Ryan Tedder; Brent Kutzle; Mikky Ekko	Tedder; Kutzle	4:00
6.	"Devil May Cry" (The Weeknd)	Tesfaye; Jason Quenneville	Rick Rubin	5:23
7.	"Who We Are" (Imagine Dragons)	Alex da Kid; Imagine Dragons; Josh Mosser	da Kid	4:09
8.	"Everybody Wants to Rule the World" (Lorde)	Ian Stanley; Roland Orzabal; Chris Hughes	Peter Shurkin	2:35
9.	"Gale Song" (The Lumineers)	Wesley Schultz; Jeremiah Fraites; Neyla Pekarek	The Lumineers	3:05
10.	"Mirror" (Ellie Goulding)	Goulding; Mathieu Jomphe	Billboard	4:21
11.	"Capitol Letter" (Patti Smith)	Smith	Tony Shanahan	3:33
12.	"Shooting Arrows at the Sky" (Santigold)	Santi White; Rick Nowels	Santigold; Doc McKinley; Nick Zimmer	3:37

Deluxe edition
No.	Title	Writer(s)	Artist	Length
13.	"Place for Us" (Mikky Ekko)	Ekko; Ammar Malik; Nick Ruth	Ruth; Ekko	3:31
14.	"Lights" (Phantogram)	Josh Carter; Sarah Barthel	John Hill; Carter	3:45
15.	"Angel on Fire" (Antony and the Johnsons)	Anohni Hegarty	Hegarty	3:47

German/Austrian edition bonus tracks
No.	Title	Length
16.	"Again" (Abby)	4:26

Brazilian edition bonus tracks
No.	Title	Length
13.	"13" (CPM 22)	1:53

== Charts ==
Chart (2013)	Peak position
Australian Albums (ARIA)	37
Belgian Albums (Ultratop Flanders)	88
Belgian Albums (Ultratop Wallonia)	96
Canadian Albums (Billboard)	9
German Albums (Offizielle Top 100)	71
New Zealand Albums (RMNZ)	14
Spanish Albums (Promusicae)	96
Swedish Albums (Sverigetopplistan)	12
Swiss Albums (Schweizer Hitparade)	66
UK Compilation Albums (OCC)	24
US Billboard 200	5

=== Year-end charts ===
Chart (2014)	Position
US Billboard 200	110
US Alternative Albums (Billboard)	15
US Top Rock Albums (Billboard)	22
US Soundtracks (Billboard)	5

== Release history ==
Region	Date	Format	Label	Catalog no.
France	November 15, 2013	Digital download	Republic Records	none
Italy	November 15, 2013	Digital download	Republic Records	none
Poland	November 15, 2013	Digital download	Republic Records	none
United Kingdom	November 15, 2013	Digital download	Republic Records	none
United States	November 19, 2013	Compact disc (Standard)	Republic Records	B0019019-02
United States	November 19, 2013	Compact disc (Deluxe)	Republic Records	B0019110-02
United States	November 19, 2013	Digital download	Republic Records, Mercury Records	none
