= 17th Hollywood Film Awards =

US film awards ceremony in 2013

- Location: Beverly Hills, California
- Founded: 1997
- Festival date: October 18–20, 2013
- Website: www.hollywoodawards.com

The 17th Hollywood Film Awards were held from October 18 to 20, 2013. The ceremony took place at The Beverly Hilton Hotel in Beverly Hills, California.

== Winners ==
- Hollywood Career Achievement Award: Harrison Ford
- Hollywood Legend Award: Jerry Weintraub
- Hollywood Actor Award: Matthew McConaughey – Dallas Buyers Club
- Hollywood Actress Award: Sandra Bullock – Gravity
- Hollywood Supporting Actor Award: Jake Gyllenhaal – Prisoners
- Hollywood Supporting Actress Award: Julia Roberts – August: Osage County
- Hollywood Breakout Performance Award: Jared Leto – Dallas Buyers Club
- New Hollywood Award: Lupita Nyong'o – 12 Years a Slave
- Spotlight Award: Michael B. Jordan – Fruitvale Station, Sophie Nélisse – The Book Thief, David Oyelowo – The Butler
- Hollywood Breakout Director Award: Steve McQueen
- Hollywood Director Award: Lee Daniels – The Butler
- Hollywood International Film Award: Paolo Sorrentino – The Great Beauty
- Hollywood Producer Award: Michael De Luca – Captain Phillips
- Hollywood Independent Film Award: Paolo Sorrentino – The Great Beauty
- Hollywood Screenwriter Award: Julie Delpy, Ethan Hawke, and Richard Linklater – Before Midnight
- Hollywood New Screenplay Award: Paolo Sorrentino and Umberto Contarello – The Great Beauty
- Hollywood Visual Effects Award: John Knoll – Pacific Rim
- Hollywood Animation Award: Dan Scanlon – Monsters University
- Hollywood Ensemble Award: Meryl Streep, Julia Roberts, Ewan McGregor, Abigail Breslin, Chris Cooper, Benedict Cumberbatch, Juliette Lewis, Margo Martindale, Dermot Mulroney, Julianne Nicholson, Sam Shepard, and Misty Upham – August: Osage County
- Hollywood Song Award: Coldplay – "Atlas" from The Hunger Games: Catching Fire
- Hollywood Costume and Production Design Award: Michael Wilkinson and Judy Becker – American Hustle
- Hollywood Film Award: Star Trek Into Darkness – J. J. Abrams
