= Elastic Heart =

2013 single by Sia featuring the Weeknd and Diplo

Single by Sia featuring the Weeknd and Diplo

from the album The Hunger Games: Catching Fire – Original Motion Picture Soundtrack
- Released: 1 October 2013
- Recorded: 2013
- Studio: Hot Closet Studios (Los Angeles)
- Genre: Electropop; pop
- Length: 4:18
- Label: RCA; Republic; Lionsgate
- Songwriters: Sia Furler; Thomas Wesley Pentz; Andrew Swanson
- Producers: Diplo; Greg Kurstin

Sia singles chronology
"She Wolf (Falling to Pieces)" (2012)	"Elastic Heart" (2013)	"Dim the Lights" (2013)

The Weeknd singles chronology
"Live For" (2013)	"Elastic Heart" (2013)	"Pretty" (2013)

Diplo singles chronology
"Coup d'Etat" (2013)	"Elastic Heart" (2013)	"XXX 88" (2013)

The Hunger Games singles chronology
"Atlas" (2012)	"Elastic Heart" (2013)	"We Remain" (2013)

"Elastic Heart" is a song written by Australian singer Sia, featuring Canadian singer the Weeknd and American record producer Diplo, for the soundtrack of The Hunger Games: Catching Fire, a film based on the novel of the same name by Suzanne Collins. Andrew Swanson assisted the artists in writing the song, with production handled by Diplo and US producer Greg Kurstin. It was released on 1 October 2013 as a single from Catching Fire by RCA, Republic and Lionsgate. "Elastic Heart" peaked at number 7 on the singles chart of New Zealand and was certified 3× Platinum by the Recorded Music NZ. It also appeared on the charts of Australia, Belgium, Switzerland and the United Kingdom.

In 2014, Sia re-recorded a solo version of "Elastic Heart" for her sixth studio album 1000 Forms of Fear. The solo version was released in 2015 as a single from the album and was accompanied by a controversial music video that features actor Shia LaBeouf and dancer Maddie Ziegler. The clip was the eighth most viewed YouTube music video in 2015, while the single peaked within the top 10 in Australia and the United Kingdom, and the top 20 in the United States.

== Release and composition ==
"Elastic Heart" (2013)
"Elastic Heart" is a R&B and trap song which talks about the protagonist's strength after a breakup.

"Elastic Heart" was released as the second single from the soundtrack for The Hunger Games: Catching Fire (2013). The song was made available for digital download on 1 October 2013. It was sent to US rhythmic contemporary radio by RCA Records, Republic Records and Lionsgate Films on 8 October 2013.

A power ballad, the main vocal hook is a chopped sample from Billy Stewart's 1957 recording "Baby, You're My Only Love", while the drumline is an altered take from Jacky Giordano's 1975 instrumental "Magolia". Hilary Hughes of The Village Voice named "Elastic Heart" a "grand, full electropop production," while Aimee Cliff from Fact characterised the song as "a pop song that bounces like rubber." Meanwhile, Rolling Stone reviewer Julianne Shepherd called it a trap song. Its lyrics address "the overwhelming strength Sia needed to convince herself that life was worth living after coming out of a crushing relationship." With the chord progression of D–A–E–F#m, the song is set in the key of F-sharp minor and a tempo of 130 beats per minute.

== Reception ==
Blue Sullivan of Slant Magazine wrote that "'Elastic Heart' is a seamless and highly successful team-up that reads like a grimier after-market version of Lady Gaga's 'Do What U Want'." Spin magazine's Chris Martins stated that "Sia soared" and it was a "bubbling ballad," and Bradley Stern of MuuMuse claimed it was "a perfectly chaotic combination." "Elastic Heart" debuted at number 67 on the Australian ARIA Singles Charts on the chart issue dated 14 October 2013. The single also charted at number 27 on the Walloon Ultratip, and number 36 in Switzerland. The song fared better in New Zealand, peaking at number 7 on the national singles chart and was certified gold by the Recorded Music NZ (RMNZ). In the United Kingdom, "Elastic Heart" debuted at number 79 on the UK Singles Chart on 12 October 2013. On 17 January 2015, the single re-entered the chart at number 61.

== Credits and personnel ==
- Songwriting, lead vocals – Sia Furler, Thomas Wesley Pentz, Andrew Swanson
- Producing – Greg Kurstin, Diplo
- Engineering – Greg Kurstin
- Additional engineering – Alex Pasco
- Vocal recording – Rob Kleiner
- Mixing – Manny Marroquin
- Additional mixing – Chris Galland, Delbert Bowers
- Mastering – Brian "Big Bass" Gardner
- Drum programming – Andrew Swanson, Diplo

Credits for "Elastic Heart" are adapted from The Hunger Games: Catching Fire soundtrack digital inlay cover.

== Charts ==
=== Weekly charts ===
Chart (2013–2014)	Peak position
Australia (ARIA)	67
Belgium Urban (Ultratop Flanders)	46
Belgium (Ultratip Bubbling Under Wallonia)	27
New Zealand (Recorded Music NZ)	7
UK Singles (Official Charts Company)	79

Chart (2015)	Peak position
Denmark (Tracklisten)	21
France (SNEP)	23
Hungary (Single Top 40)	20
Hungary (Stream Top 40)	6
Mexico Anglo (Monitor Latino)	17
Netherlands (Single Top 100)	46
Italy (FIMI)	11
New Zealand (Recorded Music NZ)	15
Norway (VG-lista)	10
Romania (Airplay 100)	35
Slovenia (SloTop50)	44
Sweden Heatseeker (Sverigetopplistan)	14
Switzerland (Schweizer Hitparade)	12
UK Singles (Official Charts)	10

=== Year-end charts ===
Chart (2015)	Position
Denmark (Tracklisten)	97
Switzerland (Schweizer Hitparade)	46

== Certifications ==
Certifications for "Elastic Heart"
Region	Certification	Certified units/sales
Denmark (IFPI Danmark)	2× Platinum	180,000^{‡}
New Zealand (RMNZ)	4× Platinum	120,000^{‡}
^{‡} Sales+streaming figures based on certification alone.

== Release history ==
Region	Date	Format	Label	Ref.
Worldwide	1 October 2013	Digital download	RCA; Republic	
United States	8 October 2013	Rhythmic radio	RCA; Republic; Lionsgate	
United States	22 October 2013	Contemporary hit radio	RCA; Republic; Lionsgate	
Italy	15 November 2013	Contemporary hit radio	Universal	

== Sia solo version ==
"Elastic Heart"

Single by Sia

from the album 1000 Forms of Fear
- Released: 9 January 2015
- Recorded: 2013
- Studio: Hot Closet Studios (Los Angeles)
- Genre: Electropop; pop
- Length: 4:17
- Label: RCA; Monkey Puzzle
- Songwriters: Sia Furler; Thomas Wesley Pentz; Andrew Swanson
- Producers: Diplo; Greg Kurstin

Sia singles chronology
"You're Never Fully Dressed Without a Smile" (2014)	"Elastic Heart" (2015)	"Déjà Vu" (2015)

Music video
- "Elastic Heart" on YouTube

In 2014, Sia recorded a solo version of "Elastic Heart" for her sixth studio album, 1000 Forms of Fear. It was released on 9 January 2015 by RCA as the third single from the album. Annie Zaleski from The A.V. Club labelled "Elastic Heart" a "striking power ballad," while AllMusic's Heather Phares picked the song as one of the three standouts from the album, alongside "Chandelier" and "Eye of the Needle". Aimee Cliff from Fact named it a "great example of how only Sia can truly rock a song written for (rather than by) Sia." The deluxe version of 1000 Forms of Fear includes a piano version of the song.

In Italy, "Elastic Heart" impacted contemporary hit radio on 9 January 2015. "Elastic Heart" debuted at number 8 on the ARIA Singles Chart on the chart issue dated 19 January 2015. The following week, the song rose to number 5. The Australian Recording Industry Association certified it 3× Platinum, which denotes shipments exceeding 210,000 copies in Australia. In the United States, "Elastic Heart" debuted at number 17 on the Billboard Hot 100 on the issue chart dated 24 January 2015, becoming the week's "Hot Shot Debut". The song was later certified double platinum for combined sales and streaming of 2 million units in the United States. In the United Kingdom, the single peaked at number 10 on the UK Singles Chart on 5 April 2015 and has since been certified triple platinum by the British Phonographic Industry.

=== Music video ===
A still from the video featuring Shia LaBeouf and Maddie Ziegler

On 7 January 2015, the music video for the song was released. Directed by Sia and Daniel Askill, shot by cinematographer Sebastian Wintero and choreographed by Ryan Heffington, the video features Maddie Ziegler, who had previously appeared in the video for Sia's single "Chandelier" and "Big Girls Cry", and actor Shia LaBeouf. In the video, Ziegler and LaBeouf perform an interpretive dance in nude and dirt-smeared outfits. Justine Harman from Elle likened the concept of the video to the plot of Titanic. Jason Lipshutz from Billboard summarised: "The entirety of the video features the surprising pair interpreting the song through different body contortions: they dance-fight, collapse in the middle of the cage, crawl toward and away from each other, and make some wildly fantastic facial expressions."

The video was nominated for the 2015 VMA Award for Best Female Video. Billboard selected the video as one "of the 10 best music videos of 2015 (so far)", as did PopCrush, commenting that the video's "lopsided choreography and filthy warfare yields a raw, junkyard beauty that doesn't ask who will make it out alive, but whether escape is ever really on the table." New York magazine's Vulture.com ranked it number 6 on its list of 2015's top 10 music videos. It was the eighth most viewed YouTube video in 2015.

==== Controversy ====
The video "courted controversy and plaudits in equal measure", with some commentators perceiving it to have pedophilic undertones because it features an adult and child dancing together clad only in beige dancewear. Sia explained that the two dancers represented "warring 'Sia' self states," but she apologized on Twitter to anyone who was upset by the video:

I anticipated some "pedophelia!!!" cries for this video. All I can say is Maddie and Shia are two of the only actors I felt could play, these two warring 'Sia' self states. I apologize to those who feel triggered by "Elastic Heart". My intention was to create some emotional content, not to upset anybody.

=== Live performances ===
On 17 January 2015, Sia performed "Elastic Heart" on Saturday Night Live with Kevin Hart hosting and Maddie Ziegler and Denna Thomsen dancing. For the performance, Sia sang the song with a short black veil covering the top half of her face, while Ziegler and Thomsen recreated the dance routine in the music video wearing nude leotards and blonde wigs. Later that month, Sia made a live rendition of the song on The Ellen DeGeneres Show. She also performed the song on The Voice UK on 28 March and The Voice US on 7 April 2015. Sia also performed this song on the Nostalgic for the Present Tour in 2016.

=== Weekly charts ===
Chart (2015)	Peak position
Australia (ARIA)	5
Austria (Ö3 Austria Top 40)	15
Belgium (Ultratop 50 Flanders)	35
Belgium (Ultratop 50 Wallonia)	16
Canada Hot 100 (Billboard)	7
Canada CHR/Top 40 (Billboard)	13
Canada Hot AC (Billboard)	17
Finland (Suomen virallinen lista)	14
Germany (GfK)	29
Ireland (IRMA)	4
Israel International Airplay (Media Forest)	2
Mexico (Billboard Mexican Airplay)	33
Norway (VG-lista)	10
Poland Airplay (ZPAV)	1
Romania (Airplay 100)	27
Scottish Singles Sales (Official Charts)	10
Spain (Promusicae)	7
Sweden (Sverigetopplistan)	14
UK Singles (Official Charts)	10
US Billboard Hot 100	17
US Adult Pop Airplay (Billboard)	27
US Dance Club Songs (Billboard)	1
US Pop Airplay (Billboard)	13

=== Year-end charts ===
Chart (2015)	Position
Australia (ARIA)	14
Austria (Ö3 Austria Top 40)	65
Belgium (Ultratop 50 Wallonia)	46
Canada (Canadian Hot 100)	38
Italy (FIMI)	50
Poland (ZPAV)	26
Spain (PROMUSICAE)	52
Sweden (Sverigetopplistan)	61
UK Singles (Official Charts Company)	32
US Billboard Hot 100	52
US Dance Club Songs (Billboard)	16

=== Certifications ===
Region	Certification	Certified units/sales
Australia (ARIA)	3× Platinum	210,000^{‡}
Belgium (BRMA)	Gold	10,000^{‡}
Canada (Music Canada)	7× Platinum	560,000^{‡}
Germany (BVMI)	Platinum	400,000^{‡}
Italy (FIMI)	2× Platinum	100,000^{‡}
Mexico (AMPROFON)	Diamond+Platinum	360,000^{‡}
Spain (Promusicae)	Platinum	40,000^{‡}
United Kingdom (BPI)	3× Platinum	1,800,000^{‡}
United States (RIAA)	5× Platinum	5,000,000^{‡}
^{‡} Sales+streaming figures based on certification alone.

=== Release history ===
Region	Date	Format	Label	Ref.
Italy	9 January 2015	Contemporary hit radio	RCA	
United States	9 February 2015	Hot adult contemporary	RCA	
United States	10 February 2015	Contemporary hit radio	RCA	
Worldwide	14 April 2015	Remixes EP	Monkey Puzzle; RCA	

== See also ==
- List of number-one dance singles of 2015 (U.S.)
