= 32 Levels =

Studio album by Clams Casino
- Released: July 15, 2016
- Recorded: 2014–16
- Genre: Electronic; hip hop; alternative R&B; cloud rap; witch house
- Length: 36:58; 73:54 (deluxe edition)
- Label: Columbia; Sony
- Producer: Clams Casino (also exec.); Esco; Illangelo; Keyboard Kid; Lil B; Mikky Ekko; MP Williams; Reefa; Sam Dew; S1; Tha Beatmakaz

Clams Casino chronology
Instrumentals 3 (2013)	32 Levels (2016)	Instrumentals 4 (2017)

Singles from 32 Levels
- 1. "Blast" Released: May 19, 2016; 2. "Witness" Released: May 26, 2016; 3. "All Nite" Released: June 9, 2016; 4. "A Breath Away" Released: June 30, 2016; 5. "Be Somebody" Released: July 14, 2016

32 Levels is the debut studio album by American record producer Clams Casino. It was released on July 15, 2016, by Columbia Records. The album contains guest appearances from Lil B, ASAP Rocky, Vince Staples, Sam Dew, Mikky Ekko, Kelela, and Samuel T. Herring, among others.

== Critical reception ==
Professional ratings
Aggregate scores
Source	Rating
AnyDecentMusic?	7.0/10
Metacritic	76/100
Review scores
Source	Rating
AllMusic	4/5 stars
The A.V. Club	B+
The Guardian	3/5 stars
The Irish Times	4/5 stars
NME	4/5
The Observer	3/5 stars
Pitchfork	6.9/10
Q	4/5 stars
Spin	7/10
Uncut	8/10

32 Levels received generally positive reviews from critics. At Metacritic, which assigns a normalized rating out of 100 to reviews from mainstream publications, the album received an average score of 76, based on 19 reviews. Writing for Exclaim!, Stephen Carlick called the album "an adventurous but inconsistent affair".

== Track listing ==
No.	Title	Writer(s)	Producer(s)	Length
1.	"Level 1"	Michael Volpe; Brandon McCartney	Clams Casino	1:44
2.	"Be Somebody" (featuring ASAP Rocky and Lil B)	Volpe; Rakim Mayers; McCartney; Mikky Ekko	Clams Casino; Tha Beatmakaz; S1	3:32
3.	"All Nite" (featuring Vince Staples)	Volpe; Vincent Staples	Clams Casino	2:48
4.	"Witness" (featuring Lil B)	Volpe; McCartney; Gregory C. Phillips, Jr.; Carter; Joseph McCartney; Lem Payne	Clams Casino; Keyboard Kid; Reefa ^{[a]}	3:38
5.	"Skull"	Volpe	Clams Casino; Sam Dew^{[b]}	1:16
6.	"32 Levels" (featuring Lil B and Joe Newman)	Volpe; Joe Newman; McCartney	Clams Casino; Lil B^{[a]}	2:59
7.	"Thanks to You" (featuring Sam Dew)	Volpe; Dew	Clams Casino; Esco	3:01
8.	"Back to You" (featuring Kelly Zutrau)	Volpe; Zutrau	Clams Casino	3:23
9.	"Into the Fire" (featuring Mikky Ekko)	Volpe; Ekko	Clams Casino; Ekko^{[a]}	3:28
10.	"A Breath Away" (featuring Kelela)	Volpe; Kelela Mizanekristos; Talay Riley; Dew	Clams Casino; Illangelo^{[b]}; MP Williams^{[b]}	4:57
11.	"Ghost in a Kiss" (featuring Samuel T. Herring)	Volpe; Jonathan Williams; Samuel T. Herring	Clams Casino; MP Williams^{[a]}; Dew^{[b]}	3:57
12.	"Blast"	Volpe; Ekko	Clams Casino	2:14
Total length:				36:58

Deluxe edition bonus tracks
No.	Title	Length
13.	"Level 1" (Instrumental)	1:43
14.	"Be Somebody" (Instrumental)	3:32
15.	"All Nite" (Instrumental)	2:48
16.	"Witness" (Instrumental)	3:38
17.	"Skull" (Instrumental)	1:16
18.	"32 Levels" (Instrumental)	2:59
19.	"Thanks to You" (Instrumental)	3:01
20.	"Back to You" (Instrumental)	3:23
21.	"Into the Fire" (Instrumental)	3:28
22.	"A Breath Away" (Instrumental)	4:57
23.	"Ghost in a Kiss" (Instrumental)	3:57
24.	"Blast" (Instrumental)	2:14
Total length:		36:56

=== Notes ===
- ^{^[a]} signifies a co-producer
- ^{^[b]} signifies an additional producer
- "Level 1" features vocals by Lil B
- "Be Somebody" features vocals by Mikky Ekko, and additional vocals by Sterling Fox

== Charts ==
Chart (2016)	Peak position
French Albums (SNEP)	132
New Zealand Heatseeker Albums (RMNZ)	7
US Billboard 200	172
US Top Dance Albums (Billboard)	1
