= Rainforest (EP) =

EP by Clams Casino
- Released: June 27, 2011
- Length: 18:30
- Label: Clams Casino Productions
- Producer: Michael Volpe

Clams Casino chronology
Instrumentals (2011)	Rainforest (2011)	Instrumentals 2 (2012)

Rainforest is the debut extended play (EP) by American musician Clams Casino, released on June 27, 2011, through Tri Angle Records. Initially known as a rap producer, Volpe's backing music started being listened to by electronic music fans after the release of his Instrumentals mixtape in March. For the Rainforest EP, he chose five instrumentals that had been rejected by rappers.

== Background and production ==
Clams Casino, real name Michael Volpe, started producing music in 2007. He began producing for rappers over the Internet, including Lil B, Havoc and Soulja Boy. After fans requested instrumental versions of the songs, he released the Instrumentals mixtape in March 2011. Volpe reported that, following the release, he started being seen as an artist in his own right instead of a rap producer and the more "textured" music he produced was rejected by rappers, but enjoyed by electronic music fans. These rejected instrumentals appeared in Rainforest; Volpe reinforced in a press release that, unlike the Instrumentals mixtape, these tracks always existed as instrumentals.

Volpe wanted to make the extended play (EP) similar to the Instrumentals mixtape. While he had a lot of music he wanted to release, including all these tracks in the album would make it feel less cohesive; so he instead chose five "really strong" tracks.

For the EP, Volpe signed with Tri Angle Records. After releasing Instrumentals, someone sent the mixtape to the label, who messaged Volpe on Twitter. Volpe was surprised that the label's sound was similar to his work and accepted their offer. In May 2011, Volpe's computer stopped working and, because he did not have a backup, he lost four years of work. Volpe noted in an interview with DMY that, had he completed the EP a few days later, "it wouldn't have happen[ed] at all!".

== Composition ==
Steve Shaw of Fact wrote that Rainforest saw Volpe pursuing "a clipped kind of Amazonian industrial" sound, contrary to rap's usual "straighter structures". Jon Caramanica of The New York Times described it as "garbled and maddening and also intoxicating, full of coughs, skitters, striated vocal samples and groaning, morbid bass", with the bass being "unusually thick, almost catastrophe-level", "[moving] with force while he spreads out decidedly pretty and melodic samples atop it".

Randall Roberts of Los Angeles Times wrote that "Treetop" "is a National Geographic acid trip: bird songs, frog croaks and insect crackles funneled through hot springs" and "Gorilla" "sounds like a '90s trip-hop track stuck in quicksand". Larry Fitzmaurice of Pitchfork compared the latter to the Instrumentals track "Motivation", though calling "Gorilla" more introspective.

== Release and reception ==
Professional ratings
Aggregate scores
Source	Rating
Metacritic	75/100
Review scores
Source	Rating
AllMusic	3.5/5 stars
Beats Per Minute	82%
Pitchfork	8.2/10
Tiny Mix Tapes	3/5 discs
XLR8R	8.5/10
The Wire	6/10

Volpe announced the EP on April 14, with Pitchfork premiering the track "Gorilla". After being available for streaming weeks earlier, Rainforest was released worldwide on June 27, 2011, in download, CD and vinyl formats; it was the first official release by Volpe. According to review aggregator Metacritic, Rainforest received "generally favorable reviews" based on a weighted average score of 75 out of 100 from 6 critics scores.

In September 2014, SL Jones rapped over Rainforest. On February 27, 2019, Volpe released a deluxe edition. In his 2017 book Sonic Intimacy, Dominic Pettman wrote: "Staying in the realm of hip-hop, [the EP] is an especially rich sonic line of inspiration for using technology to elicit or engineer the vanishing voice(s) of endangered environments and habitats." In 2020, "Treetop", "Drowning", and "Gorilla" were remastered for Volpe's compilation Instrumental Relics. That same year, Noah Yoo of Pitchfork named Rainforest one of Tri Angle Records' most essential albums, writing that "the crushed soundscapes of Rainforest showed the brilliance Clams was capable of when he flew solo".

== Track listing ==
All tracks are written by Michael Volpe

Rainforest track listing
No.	Title	Length
1.	"Natural"	3:55
2.	"Treetop"	3:21
3.	"Waterfalls"	3:33
4.	"Drowning"	3:23
5.	"Gorilla"	4:18
Total length:		18:30

Rainforest (Deluxe Edition) track listing
No.	Title	Length
6.	"Postlude Part 1"	0:52
7.	"Postlude Part 2"	0:46
Total length:		20:08
