= Instrumentals 2 =

Mixtape by Clams Casino
- Released: March 7, 2012
- Recorded: 2009–2012
- Genre: Instrumental hip-hop; electronic
- Length: 48:07
- Label: Self-released
- Producer: Clams Casino

Clams Casino chronology
Rainforest (2011)	Instrumentals 2 (2012)	Instrumentals 3 (2013)

Professional ratings
Review scores
Source	Rating
Crack	16/20
Beats Per Minute	83%
Pitchfork	7.9/10
NME	4.5/5 stars
RapReviews	8/10
No Ripcord	8/10

Instrumentals 2 (also titled Instrumental Mixtape 2) is the second mixtape by American producer Clams Casino. It was self-released on June 4, 2012.

== Track listing ==
No.	Title	Artist originally made for	Length
1.	"Palace"	ASAP Rocky	2:58
2.	"Wassup"	ASAP Rocky	2:40
3.	"Bass"	ASAP Rocky	3:02
4.	"The Fall" (original mix)	The Weeknd	3:45
5.	"Human"	Unreleased	3:26
6.	"One Last Thing"	Mac Miller	3:38
7.	"Amor Fati" (remix)	Washed Out	2:53
8.	"Angels"	Mac Miller	3:56
9.	"Leaf"	ASAP Rocky featuring Main Attrakionz	3:20
10.	"Kissing on My Syrup"	Squadda B	3:13
11.	"Swervin'" (remix)	XV	3:38
12.	"Unchain Me"	Lil B	3:51
13.	"Born to Die" (remix)	Lana Del Ray	3:07
14.	"I'm God"	Lil B	4:34
