= Instrumentals (mixtape) =

Mixtape by Clams Casino
- Released: March 7, 2011
- Recorded: 2009–2010
- Genres: Instrumental hip hop; electronic; illbient; glitchbeat; chillwave
- Length: 42:12
- Label: Self-released
- Producer: Clams Casino

Clams Casino chronology
Instrumentals (2011)	Rainforest (2011)

Alternate cover
- Physical release

Instrumentals (also titled Instrumental Mixtape) is the debut mixtape of American record producer Clams Casino. It was self-released as a free digital download on March 7, 2011. It features instrumentals of tracks that he produced for various rappers, including some bonus songs. In July 2011, Instrumentals was reissued by Type Records as a physical release.

== Music ==
Instrumentals consists of Clams Casino's reconstructions of backing tracks he originally produced for rappers such as Lil B and Soulja Boy. An electronic mixtape, it features illbient, glitchbeat, and chillwave styles. Some of the mixtape explores a more traditional hip hop sound. Its second half touches on bouncy basslines ("She's Hot"), dubstep-influenced, low-end grind ("Brainwash by London"), and vocal looping similar to the production of Kanye West ("Cold War"). Instrumentals appropriates Casino's previous hip hop beats into moody compositions, which are characterized by melodramatic drum crescendos and melancholic electronic sounds.

== Critical reception ==
Professional ratings
Review scores
Source	Rating
Fact	4.5/5
MSN Music (Expert Witness)	A−
Pitchfork	8.2/10
Resident Advisor	4.0/5
Sputnikmusic	3.5/5

In a review for Resident Advisor, Andrew Ryce called Instrumentals "a collection of aching, blown-out paeans to wonder, sadness and profound joy—music that any of the above could fall in love with." Pitchfork critic Brandon Soderberg said Casino's "attention to hip-hop structure ... makes these beats so emotionally devastating." Rory Gibb from The Quietus felt that, without the rappers they were originally produced for, the instrumentals are "revealed as intricate enough to stand alone in their own right", while sounding "ephemeral and peculiarly of this moment, phantom aggregations of mood and sound that coalesce for brief periods of time before potentially disengaging at some undisclosed point in the future." Sputnikmusic's Conrad Tao felt that, although Instrumentals sounds occasionally conventional, Casino's approach to sampling is "refreshingly abstract". He went on to write that the mixtape basically serves as "a hugely enticing teaser for what promises to be an illustrious career filled with sumptuous, bittersweet music." Writing for MSN Music, Robert Christgau said Casino's "comfortably disquieting" sound "will grow on you if you give it a chance. And because it's designed to back into your space, providing the chance won't feel all that time-consuming, preoccupied as you'll be with something more engrossing while said time passes."

Pitchfork placed Instrumentals at number 17 in its top-50 albums of 2011 list. In 2014, the website also placed the album at 100 on its list of "Best Albums of the Decade So Far." It ranked the song "Motivation" number 30 on its list of the Top-100 Tracks of 2011. Stereogum ranked the mixtape number 21 on its year-end top albums list. Fact named it as one of the best instrumental hip hop mixtapes to come after the release of J Dilla's Donuts album.

== Track listing ==
No.	Title	Artist originally made for	Length
1.	"Motivation"	Lil B	4:28
2.	"All I Need"	Soulja Boy	3:44
3.	"Real Shit from a Real Nigga"	Lil B	2:56
4.	"Realist Alive"	Lil B	4:00
5.	"Numb"	Unreleased^{[a]}	3:55
6.	"What You Doin'"	Lil B	4:19
7.	"The World Needs Change"	Soulja Boy	2:25
8.	"I'm Official"	Squadda B	2:18
9.	"Brainwash by London"	The Jealous Guys	2:56
10.	"Illest Alive"	Main Attrakionz	4:09
11.	"She's Hot"	Deezy D	2:56
12.	"Cold War"	Lil B	2:50
13.	"13"	(bonus track)	1:19

Notes

- ^{^[a]} "Numb" would later by used by ASAP Rocky on the song "Demons" from his 2011 mixtape Live. Love. ASAP.
