= Atlas (Coldplay song) =

Single by Coldplay

from the album The Hunger Games: Catching Fire – Original Motion Picture Soundtrack
- Released: 6 September 2013
- Recorded: April–July 2013
- Genre: Alternative rock
- Length: 3:56
- Label: Parlophone; Republic
- Songwriters: Guy Berryman; Jonny Buckland; Will Champion; Chris Martin
- Producers: Coldplay; Daniel Green; Rik Simpson

Coldplay singles chronology
"Hurts Like Heaven" (2012)	"Atlas" (2013)	"Magic" (2014)

The Hunger Games singles chronology
"Eyes Open" (2012)	"Atlas" (2013)	"Elastic Heart" (2013)

Lyric video
- "Atlas" on YouTube

"Atlas" is a song by British rock band Coldplay for The Hunger Games: Catching Fire – Original Motion Picture Soundtrack, the soundtrack to the 2013 American science-fiction adventure film The Hunger Games: Catching Fire. It was released digitally as the lead single from the soundtrack on 6 September 2013 worldwide, and on 8 September in the United Kingdom. The song was accompanied by a lyric video, which also premiered on 6 September.

"Atlas" has charted in 16 countries and reached top ten positions in three of them, and has also received mostly positive reviews from music critics. The ballad, winning the Hollywood Song Award at the 17th Hollywood Film Awards, was nominated for a Grammy Award for Best Song Written for Visual Media and a Golden Globe Award for Best Original Song.

== Background and recording ==
"Atlas" was Coldplay's first new track in almost two years, as the band's fifth studio album Mylo Xyloto had been released in October 2011. The song was written in early 2013, at the beginning of the recording sessions for the band's sixth studio album Ghost Stories, and recorded between April and July at the Beehive, one of the band's two studios in London. The sound of "Atlas" was influential in shaping that of Ghost Stories and Coldplay had originally considered including the track on the album, but it was ultimately left out of the tracklist. "Atlas" is not the first musical piece Coldplay have written for a film, but it's the first one the band has released exclusively as part of a soundtrack, without re-using it for any of their following studio recordings. The song "We're a Team" from the same movie score is also co-written by Coldplay, and features elements of "Atlas".

"I have great respect and admiration for Coldplay, and we are thrilled with how well they have connected to the themes and ideas within the film. Their unwavering passion and excitement for the project elevated the collaboration even further, and we can't wait to share this music with audiences around the world," said the film's director Francis Lawrence. "We are so honored that Coldplay, one of the iconic rock bands of our generation, will perform the first song out on the new soundtrack. Knowing that Chris Martin is a fan of the books makes this even more meaningful. The Coldplay single underscores the stature of recording artists we've assembled for this powerful soundtrack," added Tracy McKnight, Lionsgate's Head of Film Music.

== Composition ==
"Atlas"
"Atlas" carries a similar production style to the band's fifth studio album, Mylo Xyloto.

The song was written by all band members and produced by Rik Simpson (with whom the band has previously worked on Viva la Vida or Death and All His Friends and Mylo Xyloto), Daniel Green (Mylo Xyloto) and Coldplay themselves.

The song is a down-tempo ballad, featuring a delicate piano refrain with a "moody, haunting melody", and showcasing Martin's lower-register vocals. According to some reviewers, it sounds "less like more recent Coldplay tracks and more like a throwback to their sound on A Rush of Blood to the Head," and "like a tossed-off remnant from the outfit's early days, before it began experimenting with deep rhythms and vivid textures." The piano builds to a bolder, "anthemic-quality" chorus with richly layered production, reminiscent of the band's fifth studio album, Mylo Xyloto.

Catching Fire's major themes informed the song lyrics, with multiple references to recurring elements of the story as well as to mythology and spirituality. According to Billboard magazine, "the lyrics abstractly touch upon main characters Katniss and Peeta's mutual reliance."

== Critical reception ==
Upon release, "Atlas" received mostly positive reviews from music critics. Michael Nelson of Stereogum called the track "a swooning, appropriately cinematic ballad". Erin Coulehan of Rolling Stone wrote, "The dreamy tune features a classic Coldplay presentation, with twinkling piano that builds as Chris Martin croons 'I'll carry your world'". "The dreamy, piano-driven track was clearly written specifically for 'Catching Fire,’ with lyrics like "some bend the bow" — about bow-and-arrow-wielding heroine Katniss, presumably – and "caught in the fire" (pretty self-explanatory)," wrote Karen Lanza of PopCrush.

Upon release of the soundtrack album, Consequence of Sound's Rob Hakimian called the song, "spirited", and AllMusic's Heather Phares described it as "typically sweeping and earnest". Randall Roberts of the Los Angeles Times wrote, "Coldplay is here too, but in a battle with Lorde's haunting version of Tears for Fears' "Everybody Wants to Rule the World", Lorde would forever reign supreme". Slant's Blue Sullivan commented that "'Atlas' is autopilot Coldplay dipping into its back catalogue for a paycheck, but at least it approximates a pulse. Though the band may have zero insider-cred, 'Atlas' proves that 'Clocks' played at three-quarter speed with most of the chorus scooped out still runs rings around most of the current zeitgeist". 3voor12 listed the song among the best of the year.

=== Awards and accolades ===
On 15 October 2013, it was announced that "Atlas" would receive the Hollywood Song Award at the 17th Hollywood Film Awards. The song was also performed at the gala ceremony, which took place on 21 October 2013 at the Beverly Hilton hotel. Carlos de Abreau, the Hollywood Film Awards founder and executive director, told The Hollywood Reporter, "The Hollywood Film Awards is thrilled to present the Hollywood Song Award to a band as globally respected and prolific as Coldplay. They continue to build their legacy and, with 'Atlas' marking the first time they have recorded for a motion picture, we cannot think of an artist better deserving of this honor."

On 7 December 2013, "Atlas" received a Grammy Award nomination in the Best Song Written for Visual Media category. On 12 December 2013, it was nominated for a Golden Globe Award for Best Original Song.

== Commercial performance ==
"Atlas" has achieved moderate chart success, having charted in 16 countries. The song debuted at number twelve in the United Kingdom with sales of 19,546, and has reached top ten positions in the Netherlands, Italy and Switzerland. In the United States, it has reached number 69 on the Billboard Hot 100 chart, number 12 on the Rock Songs chart, and number 18 on the Alternative Songs chart. "Atlas" was also reported to have reached number one positions on iTunes Store charts in 43 countries upon its release. As of August 2014, "Atlas" has sold 246,000 downloads in the US.

== Music video ==
The lyric video makes numerous allusions to space phenomena, such as star trails (pictured) and mythological constellations.

A lyric video, reflecting the art style associated with The Hunger Games, premiered on music video website Vevo on the day of the single's release. It was directed by Mario Hugo and featured illustration by Micah Lidberg. The video "follows a shooting star coursing through the universe while tracing various constellations in the zodiac to the point of supernova."

Ray Rahman of Entertainment Weekly wrote, "Three things the internet is definitely not tired of yet – Coldplay, The Hunger Games, and high-production lyric videos – have all converged in the form of "Atlas." (...) The just-released visual is an intense affair set on an astral plane, full of all sorts of Olympian imagery designed to get you excited for Katniss' return to the big screen this November."

== Track listing ==
Digital download
No.	Title	Length
1.	"Atlas"	3:56

== Personnel ==
Adapted from liner notes of the "Atlas" single.

Coldplay

- Guy Berryman – bass guitar
- Jonny Buckland – electric guitar
- Will Champion – drums, backing vocals
- Chris Martin – lead vocals, piano, keyboard

Additional personnel

- Daniel Green – production
- Rik Simpson – production

== Charts ==
=== Weekly charts ===
Weekly chart performance
Chart (2013)	Peak position
Australia (ARIA)	30
Austria (Ö3 Austria Top 40)	31
Belgium (Ultratop 50 Flanders)	17
Belgium (Ultratop 50 Wallonia)	20
Canada Hot 100 (Billboard)	33
Czech Republic Airplay (ČNS IFPI)	80
Denmark (Tracklisten)	20
France (SNEP)	31
Germany (GfK)	19
Iceland (RÚV)	18
Ireland (IRMA)	12
Italy (FIMI)	9
Italy Airplay (EarOne)	25
Mexico Ingles Airplay (Billboard)	41
Netherlands (Dutch Top 40)	17
Netherlands (Single Top 100)	3
New Zealand (Recorded Music NZ)	20
Scottish Singles Sales (Official Charts)	13
Slovenia (SloTop50)	44
Spain (Promusicae)	18
Switzerland (Schweizer Hitparade)	10
UK Singles (Official Charts)	12
US Billboard Hot 100	69
US Hot Rock & Alternative Songs (Billboard)	12
US Adult Alternative Airplay (Billboard)	8
US Alternative Airplay (Billboard)	18
US Rock & Alternative Airplay (Billboard)	26

=== Year-end charts ===
Year-end chart performance
Chart (2013)	Position
Italy (Musica e dischi)	80
Netherlands (Dutch Top 40)	104
Netherlands (Single Top 100)	94
US Hot Rock Songs (Billboard)	83

== Release history ==
Release dates and formats
Region	Date	Format	Label	Ref.
Italy	6 September 2013	Contemporary hit radio	Universal Music	
United States	6 September 2013	Digital download	Parlophone	
United Kingdom	8 September 2013	Digital download	Parlophone	
United States	9 September 2013	Adult album alternative radio	Republic	
United States	10 September 2013	Modern rock radio	Republic	
United States	14 October 2013	Hot adult contemporary radio	Republic	
United States	15 October 2013	Contemporary hit radio	Republic	
