= Clams Casino (musician) =

American record producer and songwriter (born 1987)

- Also known as: Clammy Clams
- Born: Michael Thomas Volpe; May 12, 1987 (age 39); Nutley, New Jersey, U.S.
- Genres: Electronic; hip hop; cloud rap; witch house; ambient
- Occupations: Record producer; songwriter
- Years active: 2008–present
- Labels: Tri Angle; Columbia/SME
- Website: clammyclams.com

Michael Thomas Volpe (born May 12, 1987), known professionally as Clams Casino, is an American record producer and songwriter from Nutley, New Jersey. Volpe is known for his work in production for several cloud rap artists in the early 2010s. He signed with Columbia Records to release his debut studio album, 32 Levels (2016), which narrowly entered the Billboard 200. He has produced songs for artists including Lil Peep, ASAP Rocky, Lil B, Vince Staples, Joji, the Weeknd, and Mac Miller, and has remixed songs for Big K.R.I.T., Washed Out, The Kid Laroi, and Lana Del Rey.

== Career ==
A resident of Hasbrouck Heights, New Jersey, Volpe got his start in music tinkering with keyboards while he was a student at Nutley High School.

Volpe's official debut EP Rainforest was released on Tri Angle Records in 2011. His Instrumentals mixtape was released on March 7, 2011, followed by the release of Instrumentals 2 on June 5, 2012 and Instrumentals 3 in 2013. The mixtapes were distributed for free through his website.

Volpe contributed a score for Locomotor, a work choreographed by his cousin Stephen Petronio released in 2014. He released his debut studio album 32 Levels through Columbia Records in 2016. He followed it up with his Instrumentals 4 mixtape, released in 2017.

In April 2020, Clams Casino cleared the Imogen Heap sample for his instrumental "I'm God", which first appeared on Lil B's 2009 album 6 Kiss. The song remains his most popular, with over 25 million views on YouTube.

In August 2025, Italian producer Sick Luke announced that Clams Casino would feature in his latest album "Dopamina".

== Musical style ==
Volpe's music has been described as "[bringing] together conventional hip-hop drums, a sensitive ear for off-to-the-side melodies, and an overdose of oddly moving atmosphere."

== Discography ==
=== Studio albums ===
List of studio albums, with selected details
Title	Album details
32 Levels	Released: July 15, 2016; Label: Columbia/SME; Format: CD, LP, digital download, streaming
Moon Trip Radio	Released: November 7, 2019; Label: Second City Prints; Format: CD, LP, digital download, streaming

=== Extended plays ===
List of extended plays, with selected details
Title	Album details
Rainforest	Released: June 27, 2011; Label: Tri Angle Records; Format: digital download, streaming, vinyl, CD
Spider Web (with Wicca Phase Springs Eternal and Fish Narc)	Released: November 23, 2018; Label: Dark Medicine; Format: digital download, streaming
Winter Flower Reimagined (with Jazztronik)	Released: March 11, 2022; Label: Clams Casino Productions; Format: digital download, streaming

=== Mixtapes ===
List of mixtapes, with selected details
Title	Album details
Instrumentals	Released: March 7, 2011; Label: Self-released; Format: digital download, streaming
Instrumentals 2	Released: June 5, 2012; Label: Self-released; Format: digital download, streaming
Instrumentals 3	Released: December 18, 2013; Label: Self-released; Format: digital download, streaming
Instrumentals 4	Released: June 26, 2017; Label: Self-released; Format: digital download, streaming
Winter Flower	Released: November 17, 2021; Label: Self-released; Format: digital download, streaming

=== Compilations ===
List of compilations, with selected details
Title	Album details
Instrumental Relics	Released: April 24, 2020; Label: Self-released; Format: digital download, streaming

=== Singles ===
==== As lead artist ====
List of singles as lead artist, with showing year released and album name
Title	Year	Album
"Wizard"	2011	Adult Swim Singles Program 2011
"Worth It" (with Danny Brown)	2015	Adult Swim Singles Program 2015
"Blast"	2016	32 Levels
"Witness" (featuring Lil B)	2016	32 Levels
"All Nite" (featuring Vince Staples)	2016	32 Levels
"A Breath Away" (featuring Kelela)	2016	32 Levels
"Be Somebody" (featuring ASAP Rocky and Lil B)	2016	32 Levels
"Be Somebody (Remix)" (featuring ASAP Rocky, AJ Tracey and Lil B)	2016	Non-album singles
"Live My Life" (featuring Lil B)	2016	Non-album singles
"Time"	2016	Savefabric
"Summer Bummer (Clams Casino Remix)" (with Lana Del Rey featuring ASAP Rocky and Playboi Carti)	2017	Non-album singles
"Vampire Knight" (with Chxpo)	2018	Non-album singles

==== As featured artist ====
List of singles as featured artist, with showing year released and album name
Title	Year	Album
"Kali Yuga" (Ghostemane featuring Clams Casino)	2017	Non-album singles
"4 Gold Chains" (Lil Peep featuring Clams Casino)	2018	Non-album singles
"Can't Get Over You" (Joji featuring Clams Casino)	2018	Ballads 1
